The Exorcist is a 1973 American supernatural horror film directed by William Friedkin and written for the screen by William Peter Blatty, based on his 1971 novel of the same name. It stars Ellen Burstyn, Max von Sydow, Lee J. Cobb, Kitty Winn, Jack MacGowran (in his final film role), Jason Miller and Linda Blair. It follows the demonic possession of a young girl and her mother's attempt to rescue her through an exorcism conducted by a pair of Catholic priests.

The book was a bestseller, but Blatty, who also produced, and Friedkin, his choice for director, had difficulty casting the film. Unable to hire major stars of the era, they cast relative unknowns Burstyn, Blair and Miller (author of a hit play with no film acting experience), choices vigorously opposed by Warner Brothers executives. Principal photography was also difficult. Friedkin insisted on realism, going to northern Iraq to film the prologue despite political instability in the region, relying on live special effects and casting real priests and medical personnel in the film. Crew also recalled that he was temperamental, often firing people without warning. A fire destroyed most of the set, some crewmembers died, and Blair and Burstyn suffered accidental long-term back injuries; he also deliberately made cast members uncomfortable, going as far as refrigerating the set where the exorcism scenes took place to temperatures well below zero Fahrenheit so their breath would be visible. Production took twice as long as scheduled and cost almost three times the initial budget; some deaths and accidents that occurred have led to a belief that the film was cursed.

The Exorcist was released in 24 theaters in North America in late December 1973. Audiences flocked to it despite mixed reviews, waiting in long lines during winter weather, many more than once; the sold out shows were even more profitable for Warners since they had booked it into those theaters under four wall distribution rental agreements, the first time a major studio had done that. Some viewers suffered adverse physical reactions, fainting or vomiting to scenes in which the protagonist undergoes a realistic cerebral angiography and later violently masturbates with a crucifix. Heart attacks and a miscarriage were reported among viewers; a psychiatric journal published a paper on "cinematic neurosis" triggered by the film. Many children were allowed to see it, leading to charges that the MPAA ratings board had accommodated Warner Bros by giving the film an R-rating instead of the X-rating they thought it deserved, in order to ensure its commercial success. Several cities attempted to ban it outright or prevent children from attending.

The cultural conversation around the film, which also encompassed its treatment of Catholicism (and, in the years since, its apparent anti-feminism), helped it become the first horror film to be nominated for the Academy Award for Best Picture one of 10 for which it was nominated, and winning for Best Adapted Screenplay and Best Sound. It has had several sequels, and was the highest-grossing R-rated horror film (unadjusted for inflation) until the 2017 release of It. The Exorcist has had a significant influence on popular culture and has received critical acclaim, with several publications regarding it as one of the greatest horror films ever made. In 2010, the Library of Congress selected The Exorcist to be preserved in its National Film Registry, citing it as "culturally, historically, or aesthetically significant".

Plot

Theatrical cut

In northern Iraq, Catholic priest Lankester Merrin participates in an archaeological dig which unearths a medallion of Saint Joseph and an artifact representing Pazuzu, an ancient demon. As Merrin prepares to leave Iraq, he sees a large statue of Pazuzu, and two dogs fighting.

In the Washington, D.C., neighborhood of Georgetown, actress Chris MacNeil works on a film directed by her friend Burke Dennings. A temporary resident, Chris lives in a well-appointed house with servants and her 12-year-old daughter Regan. Georgetown-based priest Damien Karras visits his mother in New York. He confides to a colleague that he feels unfit in his role as counselor to other priests, citing a crisis of faith. Chris hears noises in the attic, and Regan tells her of an imaginary friend named "Captain Howdy". In a local church, a statue of Mary is found desecrated.

Chris hosts a party. Karras' friend Father Dyer explains Karras' role as counselor, mentioning that his mother died recently. Regan appears and urinates on the carpet. After Chris puts Regan to bed, her bed shakes violently. Dyer consoles Karras, and Karras expresses guilt at not having been with his mother when she died. Karras dreams of his mother, a Saint Joseph medallion and—briefly—a demonic face.

Regan becomes violent. She is subjected to several medical tests which fail to find anything physically wrong with her. During a house call, a demon possesses Regan's body; the possessed Regan exhibits abnormal strength. One night, Chris finds the house empty except for a sleeping Regan. Dennings is found dead at the foot of an outdoor staircase beneath Regan's window. Homicide detective William Kinderman questions Karras, confiding that Dennings' body was found with its head turned backwards.

Regan's condition worsens, and her body becomes covered with sores. A doctor mentions exorcism as a remote option, suggesting a possible psychological benefit. Kinderman visits Chris, explaining that the only plausible explanation for Dennings' death is that he was pushed from Regan's window. As Kinderman leaves, the possessed Regan stabs her genitals with a crucifix. To Chris' horror, the possessed Regan turns her head backwards and speaks in Dennings' voice. The possessed Regan is confined to her bedroom.

Chris seeks out Karras, who visits Regan. Over two meetings, the possessed Regan claims to be the Devil himself, projectile vomits into Karras' face, speaks in tongues, and reacts violently when tap water is sprinkled on her, which Karras had claimed was holy water—a point against genuine possession. The demon says it will remain in Regan until she is dead. Desperate, Chris confides that the possessed Regan killed Dennings. At night, Chris' assistant calls Karras to the house. They witness the words "help me" materialize on Regan's skin. Still ambivalent, Karras nevertheless concludes that an exorcism is warranted. His superior grants permission on the condition that an experienced priest lead the ritual while Karras assists. Merrin, having performed an exorcism before, is summoned.

Merrin arrives at the house, warning Karras that the demon uses a psychological attack. As the priests read from the Roman Ritual, the demon curses them. It focuses on Karras, verbally attacking his loss of faith and guilt over the circumstances of his mother's death. The priests rest momentarily and Merrin, shaking, takes nitroglycerin. Karras enters the bedroom where the demon appears as his mother. Showing weakness, Karras exclaims that the demon is not his mother. Merrin excuses Karras and continues the exorcism by himself. Karras assures Chris that Regan will not die and re-enters the room, finding Merrin dead. Enraged, Karras beats the possessed Regan and demands that the demon take him instead. The demon rips a medallion of Saint Joseph from Karras' neck and begins to possess him, freeing Regan. Karras hurls himself out the window, tumbling down the stairs outside. Chris and Kinderman enter the room. Chris embraces the healed Regan, and Kinderman surveys the violence and confusion. Outside, Dyer administers the last rites as Karras dies.

The MacNeils prepare to leave, and Father Dyer says goodbye. Despite having no memory of her ordeal, Regan is moved by the sight of Dyer's clerical collar to kiss him on the cheek. As the MacNeils leave, Chris gives Dyer the medallion found in Regan's room.

Director's cut ending
In 2000, "The Version You've Never Seen" or the "Extended Director's Cut", was released. In the ending of this version, when Chris gives Karras' medallion to Dyer, Dyer places it back in her hand and suggests that she keep it. After she and Regan drive away, Dyer pauses at the top of the stone steps before walking away and coming across Kinderman, who narrowly missed Chris and Regan's departure; Kinderman and Dyer begin to develop a friendship.

Cast

Production

Aspects of Blatty's novel were inspired by the 1949 exorcism performed on an anonymous boy known as "Roland Doe" or "Robbie Mannheim" (pseudonyms) by the Jesuit priest William S. Bowdern. The novel changed several details of the case, such as the sex and age of the allegedly possessed victim. Harper & Row, believing the book would sell well, published it and sent Blatty on a 26-city book tour. But despite enthusiastic reviews, sales were not as strong as the publisher had hoped; at one point on the book tour the bookstore cancelled Blatty's appearance because, it told him, so few copies had been sold that it was remaindering the unsold ones back to the publisher. Harper was about to give up and had even, according to Blatty, treated him to a farewell lunch, when an opportunity to appear on The Dick Cavett Show came up after one guest canceled and the other, actor Robert Shaw, was too drunk to go on. Cavett was uninterested in the supernatural, but let Blatty talk about The Exorcist at length, captivating the audience with discussions of whether the devil existed. Soon afterwards the novel was atop the New York Times best seller list.

Despite Blatty's previous experience working in Hollywood as a writer for Blake Edwards' films, film studios had generally been uninterested in adapting The Exorcist before its publication. Lew Grade made a modest offer for the rights that Blatty said later he would have accepted due to his difficult financial circumstances, but for his requirement that he produce. Shirley MacLaine, a friend of Blatty's on whom he had based the Chris McNeil character in the novel, to the point of using some things she had said in the past as dialogue, had been interested. But Blatty refused to back down on producing, so they moved on to other projects.

Paul Monash, producer of Butch Cassidy and the Sundance Kid, then expressed interest. He and Blatty reached a $400,000 ($ in modern dollars) deal that gave Monash six months to get a studio to commit to filming The Exorcist. He soon secured a deal with Warner Bros. for $641,000. Blatty recalled that studio head John Calley had been reading the book at his home, alone, in his bedroom, and found his dog unusually unwilling to join him on the bed. He tried to drag the dog onto the bed but the animal resisted vigorously. When he finally succeeded, he found the book was hot to the touch.

Blatty and Monash had agreed to be co-producers. But Monash wanted changes to the story Blatty opposed, such as setting it somewhere else, making Kinderman less colorful and Chris something other than a film actress, getting rid of the prologue and even Father Merrin's character. Hearing rumors that Monash was planning something behind his back, Blatty was able to sneak into his office at Warners and surreptitiously copy some papers from Monash's files that lent credence to those rumors. When he shared those papers with the studio, he became the film's sole producer.

Writing

Blatty's screenplay follows the plot of his novel closely, but narrows the story's focus. Subplots like the desecration of the churches (and the relationship between Karras and Kinderman that develops from the latter's investigation), Karras's efforts to get the Church bureaucracy to approve the exorcism, and the ongoing medical investigations of Regan's condition, are acknowledged in the film but to a much lesser degree than they are in the novel. Similarly, characters such as Chris's household staff, Dennings, and Regan's father, play a much smaller role, and the overall time frame of the plot is condensed.

"I compressed the first third of my book into only 33 pages" of script, Blatty wrote later. He eliminated the subplot with Karl's daughter Elvira, despite its reinforcement of Merrin's belief that some good will always eventually come of any evil since at the end of the novel she goes into treatment for her heroin addiction. "I hated to do that", he admitted. "But there simply wasn't time and the subplot had to go." For the same reason he greatly reduced the suggestions that Karras was responsible for both Denning's death and the desecrations in the chapel, hints he felt many readers had missed anyway.

Some scenes, particularly those with sexual content, were toned down for the movie since an actress of approximately Regan's age was expected to be playing the part. The scene where Regan masturbates with a crucifix was, in the book, more prolonged and explicit, with Regan seriously injuring herself yet attaining orgasm. The film also excludes the detail from the book that when possessed, Regan experiences constant diarrhea, requiring that she wear a diaper and giving her room a strong odor. One of the film's religious advisers, Father John Nicola, who had opposed including both the crucifix scene and the desecration, nevertheless advised that the language used by Pazuzu when possessing Regan should be even more profane than it was in the book, to an extent he considered more realistic; it was changed accordingly.

Blatty also made the screenplay unambiguous about Regan's condition. In his novel every symptom and behavior she exhibits that might indicate possession is counterbalanced with a reference to an actual case where the same phenomena were found to have natural, scientific causes. Beyond Karras' initial professional skepticism, that perspective is absent from the film.

When Friedkin came onto the project as director, Blatty expected that, as directors usually do, he would propose some changes to the story. But Friedkin did not, insisting on following the novel closely. According to Blatty, Friedkin even asked him, in one scene, to restore some slight changes to his dialogue to what it had originally been in the book.

Casting

The film's lead roles, particularly Regan, were not easily cast. Although many major stars of the era were considered for the role, with Stacy Keach signed to play Father Karras at one point, Blatty and Friedkin ultimately went with less well-known actors, to the consternation of the studio.

Chris and Father Karras
The studio wanted Marlon Brando for the role of Lankester Merrin. Friedkin did not want to make a "Brando movie" and refused. Jack Nicholson was considered for Karras, and Paul Newman interested, before Blatty hired Stacy Keach.

Three A-list actresses of the time were considered for Chris. Audrey Hepburn said she would take the role but only if the movie could be shot in Rome, where she was living. That posed too many problems, so Friedkin looked next to Anne Bancroft. She was also willing but only if production could start after she gave birth; Friedkin could not wait nine months. Jane Fonda, next on the list, purportedly derided the film and turned it down.

Blatty suggested his friend Shirley MacLaine for the part, but Friedkin was hesitant to cast her, given her lead role in another possession film, The Possession of Joel Delaney, two years before. After meeting Carol Burnett at a party, Friedkin believed she had the range beyond her comic television persona, and Blatty agreed, but the studio was not so eager to have her in the role. Ellen Burstyn received the part after she phoned Friedkin and emphatically stated that she was "destined" to play Chris, discussing her own Catholic upbringing and later rejection of it. Studio head Ted Ashley vigorously opposed casting her, not only telling Friedkin that he would do so over his dead body, but dramatizing that opposition by making Friedkin walk over him as he lay on the floor, then grabbing the director's leg and telling him he would come back from the dead if necessary to keep Friedkin from doing so. However, no other alternatives emerged, and Ashley relented.

With Burstyn now set in the part, Friedkin received a surprise return call from Jason Miller whom he had talked to after a performance of his play That Championship Season about the lapsed Catholicism in it, as background for the film, and left him. He had read a copy of the novel Friedkin left him, and told the director "[Karras] is me". Miller had had a Catholic education, and had studied to be a Jesuit priest himself for three years at Catholic University of America (also in Washington) until experiencing a spiritual crisis, as Karras does at the beginning of the story. Friedkin thanked him for his interest but told him Keach had already been signed.

Miller, who had done some stage acting but had never been in a film, asked to be given a screen test. Friedkin had the playwright and Burstyn do the scene where Chris tells Karras she thinks Regan might be possessed. Afterwards, he had Burstyn interview Miller about his life with the camera focusing on him from over her shoulder, and finally asked Miller to say Mass as if for the first time. Burstyn felt Miller was too short for the part, unlike her boyfriend at the time, whom Friedkin had auditioned but passed on. The director felt the test was promising but, after viewing the footage the next morning, realized Miller's "dark good looks, haunted eyes, quiet intensity, and low, compassionate voice", qualities which to him evoked John Garfield, were exactly what the part needed. The studio bought out Keach's contract.

Regan
Directors considered for the project were skeptical that a young actress could carry the film. Mike Nichols had turned down The Exorcist specifically because he did not believe a 12-year-old girl who could play the very stressful part could be found. The first actresses considered had been in other successful films and television series. Pamelyn Ferdin, a veteran of science fiction and supernatural drama was ultimately turned down as too familiar. Denise Nickerson, who had appeared in two roles on the horror-soap opera Dark Shadows and played Violet Beauregarde in Willy Wonka & the Chocolate Factory, said in later interviews her family found the script too dark for her. Janet Leigh would not let her daughter, Jamie Lee Curtis, audition.

Friedkin had interviewed young women as old as 16 who looked young enough to play Regan, but found none. Then Elinore Blair came in unannounced with her daughter Linda; her agency had not sent her for the part, but she had previously met with Warners' casting department. Both impressed Friedkin. Elinore was not a typical stage mother, and Linda's credits were primarily in modeling and a single soap opera role. "[S]mart but not precocious. Cute but not beautiful. A normal, happy 12-year-old girl", Friedkin later recalled.

With Linda having the qualities Friedkin was looking for, he wanted to see if she could handle the material. He asked if she knew what The Exorcist was about; she told him she had read the book. "[I]t's about a little girl who gets possessed by the devil and does a whole bunch of bad things." Friedkin then asked her what sort of bad things she meant. "[S]he pushes a man out of her bedroom window and she hits her mother across the face and she masturbates with a crucifix." Friedkin then asked Linda if she knew what masturbation meant. "It's like jerking off, isn't it?", and she giggled a little bit. "Have you ever done that?" he asked. "Sure; haven't you?" she responded.

She was cast after tests with Burstyn; Friedkin wanted to keep that level of spontaneity on set. "After all these difficult scenes she'd tiptoe around and giggle, after every bit", Blatty recalled. "It was all a big funhouse ride for her. She was disturbed only one time, and that was when her pet mouse died." After filming, Friedkin had similar praise: "She is the most totally pulled together, stable, mature young person I've ever met. The whole thing was a game to her." Of the 500 actresses he said he saw audition, "there wasn't one other I would have considered."

Friedkin originally intended to use Blair's voice, electronically treated, for the demon's dialogue. He felt this worked fine in some places, but the scenes with the demon confronting the two priests lacked the dramatic power required and so cast Mercedes McCambridge, an experienced voice actress and Oscar winner, as the demon's voice. After filming, Warners did not credit her, until Screen Actors Guild arbitration. While that arbitration was concluded quickly enough that McCambridge's name was included in the credits on all but the first 30 prints, it prevented the release of a soundtrack album that was to include excerpts of dialogue.

Actress Eileen Dietz, 15 years Blair's senior, stood in for her in the crucifix scene, the fistfight with Father Karras, and others that were too violent or disturbing for Blair to perform. She also appears as the face of Pazuzu. Friedkin gave her no notes, telling her to play the possessed Regan as "a primal force of malevolence ... I wasn't playing a little girl, I was playing the demon that possessed a little girl".

Reportedly Warners had forced Friedkin to hire her; he in turn used her only when absolutely necessary. Blair, who recalls Friedkin telling her the film would not succeed if she was not in as many shots as possible, estimates that Dietz's total screen time amounts to 17 seconds. Dietz, angry that her contribution to the film had been minimized, claimed in the media to have done all the possession scenes. Warners ultimately measured her screen presence at 28.25 seconds.

Supporting roles

The film's supporting roles were cast more quickly. A Philippe Halsman photograph of Pierre Teilhard de Chardin, one of Blatty's inspirations for Father Merrin, inspired Friedkin to cast Max von Sydow instead of Paul Scofield, who Blatty had wanted. "He portrays great spiritual quality on film." At a play, Blatty and Friedkin ran into Lee J. Cobb, who was cast as Lt. Kinderman.

Two priests were cast. Father William O'Malley had become acquainted with Blatty through his criticism of the novel. After Blatty introduced him to Friedkin, they cast him as Father Dyer, a character O'Malley had considered clichéd in the novel. The Rev. Thomas Bermingham, the Georgetown professor who assigned Blatty to do the research on demonic possession that later informed the novel, took the role of the university president.

Cast sheets in The Hollywood Reporter and a Warners press release, list British director J. Lee Thompson as a member of the cast early in production. It was suggested that he would be playing Dennings, whom Shirley MacLaine says was based on him as he had directed the 1965 film John Goldfarb, Please Come Home!, which Blatty had adapted for the screen from his novel, but Jack MacGowran got the role instead. A later cast listing adds Mary Boylan and The Rev. John Nicola, one of the film's technical advisors, in small roles. Greek actor Titos Vandis, cast as Karras's uncle, covered his face with a hat, as Friedkin felt audiences would associate him with his role in the recent Woody Allen film Everything You Always Wanted to Know About Sex* (*But Were Afraid to Ask). Friedkin reportedly cast Vasiliki Maliaros as Karras's mother after encountering her in a Greek restaurant.

Direction

Warners had approached Arthur Penn, Stanley Kubrick, and Mike Nichols to direct; for various reasons they were turned down or turned it down. Blatty recalled in 2015 that one director wanted to set the film in Salem, Massachusetts, which he rejected because he considered the contrast between the worldly nature of the capital and the supernatural aspects of the plot to be essential to the story.

The studio finally hired Mark Rydell to direct, but Blatty insisted on Friedkin as he had been impressed by The French Connection. He also knew Friedkin, who had critiqued his Darling Lili screenplay over lunch before production. Blatty also appreciated that at a meeting with Edwards, Friedkin had been extremely frank about the shortcomings of a Peter Gunn script.

Blatty saw Friedkin as "a director who can bring the look of documentary realism to this incredible story, and ... a guy who is never going to lie to me." The studio was still resistant, until The French Connection was released to commercial success and a Best Picture Academy Award. While doing his press tour for that film, Friedkin began reading a copy of the novel Blatty had sent. After the first 20 pages he canceled his dinner plans and finished the book. The issues that had given other directors pause did not bother Friedkin: "I was so overwhelmed by the power of this story, and I didn't stop to think about the problems involved with making it."

"The pacing is deliberate, and I wanted it to happen slowly because the story, as it affected the real people who inspired it, took place in just that way", Friedkin said in 2015. "I felt we had to go through all of that. You had to see the symptoms. You had to see the treatment that was given out by internal medicine and by psychiatry, and to see that it all had been tried and failed."

Early in production, Blatty fired Friedkin when he challenged him after they clashed over what the director felt was Blatty's mishandling of Burstyn's request that a limousine pick her up from the airport, a policy Friedkin himself had instituted. Blatty assumed the two would soon reconcile. Two days later, according to Blatty, he was summoned to a meeting with not only Friedkin but his agent and seven studio lawyers who told Blatty he could not fire the director. After that, Blatty recalled to Peter Biskind, he informed the studio he could no longer have any responsibility for controlling the budget; he and Friedkin did reconcile and got along well for the rest of the picture. Production costs soon exceeded the film's initial $4.2 million ($ in modern dollars) budget.

Friedkin went to great lengths manipulating the actors to get the genuine reactions he wanted. Later, Friedkin was unsatisfied with O'Malley's performance as Dyer ministers to the dying Karras at the end of the film, telling him he was doing it "by the numbers". O'Malley protested that it was 2:30 a.m. and he had just administered last rites to his friend for the 15th time. Friedkin then asked if O'Malley trusted him; when the priest said yes, Friedkin slapped him hard across the face to generate a deeply solemn yet literally shaken reaction for the scene, offending the many Catholic crew members on set. "It was beyond what anyone needs to do to make a movie," Burstyn said in 2019.

He also fired blanks without warning to elicit shock from Miller for a take; Dietz recalls him also doing this during the scene where Regan assaults the doctors who have come to see her. Friedkin also told Miller that the vomit, porridge colored to resemble pea soup and pumped through a hidden tube, would hit him in the chest during the projectile vomiting scene, and rehearsed it that way. But when filmed, the soup hit his face, resulting in his disgusted reaction.

Friedkin also used smell to manipulate the actors, Dietz recalls. Since the demon's presence was, in the book, accompanied by the stench of Regan's near-continuous diarrhea, to ensure an equally distasteful odor on set the director would hide rotten meat or eggs on the set. While it worked initially, "[t]he problem was the crew and the cast all got sick so we had to stop shooting", she said.

Crewmembers found Friedkin demanding and sometimes difficult to work with. One of the first shots, when production began in New York, was of bacon being cooked on a griddle. It begins as a close-up and then pulls back. A wall had been built opposite the stove, leaving almost no space for the dolly, so Friedkin halted shooting while it was removed. Afterward, he did not like the way the bacon curled while cooking, so the prop master was sent to look for preservative-free bacon, difficult to find at the time, further delaying the scene. Another crewmember recalls returning after three days of sick leave to find Friedkin still shooting the same scene.

Dietz recalls shooting taking so long because Friedkin reshot most of the film. Even scenes that had been difficult to stage and film the first time, such as Regan's bed shaking, were redone. "People were literally placing bets on what he would re-shoot next."

Friedkin also fired and rehired crew regularly. One crewmember recalls seeing the director shake hands warmly with someone, and then seconds later tell a second person to "get this guy outta here". This mercurial behavior led the crew to call him "Wacky Willy".

Cinematography

Director of photography Owen Roizman had worked with Friedkin in that capacity on The French Connection. The two collaborated again on The Exorcist, with Roizman in charge of filming every scene in the film save those in the Iraqi prologue, shot by Billy Williams. In a 1974 interview with American Cinematographer, the magazine of the American Society of Cinematographers, Roizman discussed The Exorcist at length.

"[H]e figured that since we'd done so well the last time, maybe we could do it again", Roizman said, recalling how Friedkin had gotten him to work on The Exorcist. They agreed that, like their earlier film, they wanted the next one to look as if shot with available light. But this time they would eschew Connections documentary look. The MacNeil house was, unlike house interiors in horror films such as Psycho, designed to look normal and inviting. "What we tried to do, by means of the lighting, was to give it a kind of ominous feeling—as if some lurking, mysterious thing were hanging over it. That's about as far as we went with photographic style."

While much of the filming took place in the set for Regan's bedroom, there were some other parts of the house set that presented challenges when filming. Roizman said the  ceiling of the basement set left no room for conventional lighting setups. "There was really no place at all to put lights and, in doing any sort of pan around or dolly shot, we would have been fighting ourselves had we tried to use conventional lighting units." But the crew was able to make those shots work by replacing the ceiling's practical light bulbs with photofloods.

"Friedkin demanded complete realism", Roizman recalled. "He wanted to see pictures with glass in them, mirrors on the walls and all of the other highly reflective surfaces you would naturally find in a house, we never tried to cover anything up, as we would normally do for expedience in shooting." This realism meant that the kitchen set, with much stainless steel and glass, was "virtually impossible" to light beyond the practical ceiling fixtures and whatever other lights they could manage to sneak in and hide. "[W]e'd walk in, hit the switch and shoot—through not much choice."

One shot early in the film seemed simple when seen but, according to Roizman, required intense preparation and rehearsal. In it, Sharon greets the doctors and escorts them upstairs to Regan's room. The camera starts the scene at the top of the staircase, follows the actors from there as they walk towards it, tracks backward in front of them as they walk up to it towards the room around two corners and then turns again to let the actors pass, pan right and follow Karen as she goes to the door. It was necessary first to build a specialized chair for the camera operator on a track along the ceiling, then the grips had to move the camera in sync with the actors without causing any bumps. It was then necessary to light the scene while avoiding any crew shadows, which they did with photofloods and striplights through overhead muslin. "If I were to do that shot over again, I would probably underexpose a bit more to accentuate the shadows, but, all in all, the shot worked very well" said Roizman

Filming and locations

The film's opening sequences were filmed in and near the city of Mosul, Iraq, a country with which the U.S. did not then have diplomatic relations, and was also experiencing civil unrest that later grew into civil war; Warners feared that Friedkin and his crew might not be able to return. Friedkin negotiated filming arrangements directly with the local officials of the ruling Ba'ath Party. He was allowed to shoot only on the condition that he hire lots of local workers as crew and teach some classes in filmmaking to interested residents, primarily in how to create and use fake blood. The archaeological dig site shown is ancient Hatra, south of Mosul. Temperatures during the days filming took place reached , limiting shooting to the early mornings and evenings. After shooting William Kaplan, the film's production supervisor, was held under armed guard in Baghdad as a check from Warners bounced.

Although the film is set in Washington, D.C., many interior scenes were shot in various parts of New York City. The MacNeil residence interiors were filmed at CECO Studios in Manhattan. Principal photography began in mid-August 1972 with Karras's confrontation with his uncle over his mother's care, shot at Goldwater Memorial Hospital (since demolished to make way for Cornell Tech) on Roosevelt Island in the East River between Manhattan and Queens; the scenes with Karras's mother in the hospital were filmed at Bellevue. The scene where Father Karras listens to the tapes of Regan's dialogue was filmed in the basement of Keating Hall at Fordham University in the Bronx. where O'Malley, who plays Dyer, was an assistant professor of theology.

The exterior of the MacNeil house was a family home on 36th and Prospect in Washington, on the former site of E. D. E. N. Southworth's residence. A mansard roof was added to account for the scene in which Chris investigates the scratching noises in the attic.

The stairs were padded with half-inch-thick rubber to film the death of the character Father Damien Karras. Because the house from which he falls was set back slightly from the steps, the crew built an eastward extension with a false front to film the scene. The stuntman tumbled down the stairs twice. Georgetown University students charged people around $5 each to watch the stunt from the rooftops.

The interior of Karras' room at Georgetown was a meticulous reconstruction of theology professor Father Thomas M. King's "corridor Jesuit" room in New North Hall. King's room was photographed by production staff after a visit by Blatty, a Georgetown graduate, and Friedkin. Back in New York, every element of King's room, including posters and books, was recreated, including a poster of Pierre Teilhard de Chardin, a theologian on whom Merrin was loosely based. Georgetown was paid a thousand dollars ($ in modern dollars) per day of filming. Locations on campus included both exteriors such as Burstyn's first scene, shot on the steps of the Flemish Romanesque Healy Hall, and interiors such as the defilement of the statue of the Virgin Mary in Dahlgren Chapel, and the Archbishop's office, actually the office of the university's president. One scene was filmed in The Tombs, a student hangout across from the steps.

Roizman recalls the scenes in the chapel as the hardest interior to light outside of the house sets. In order to give it the same available-light look as the house interiors for an establishing shot that included the stained glass windows, it was necessary to rig it with 225-amp "Brute" arc lights on  parallel mounts. "It was backbreaking work ... but the results were quite pleasing."

Exorcism scenes

The scenes where Merrin and Karras perform the exorcism were challenging to film. Following the novel, Friedkin wanted the bedroom set to be cold, cold enough to see the actors' breath. Since the set lighting warmed the air, it could only remain cold enough to film for three minutes at a time. It broke down frequently, and Friedkin was only able to complete five shots each day; the complete scene thus took a month to film, in continuity, the order they were written in the script.

Originally it was hoped that the room would not have to be chilled that much. But while the actors' breath was visible at just below freezing, the set was too quickly warmed by the filming equipment. Going down to  worked, but according to Roizman Friedkin decided on the maximum in order to improve the actors' performance. "An actor on his knees for 15 minutes at 20 below zero is really going to feel cold. It worked out very well."

Once the actors' breath appeared, it was necessary to backlight the actors, which while it is easy enough to do in still photography is much harder when filming a movie. "[W]ith the actors moving all the time, it got to be a bit difficult. It was always a matter of finding a place to hide the backlight and finding a way to keep it off of the actors", Roizman said.

Blair wore green contact lenses meant to give her eyes a bestial appearance for scenes when Regan is possessed. To accentuate them, the crew used a soft light with its barn doors nearly closed to throw a narrow strip of light across her eyes. "It's probably a 75 mm lens, because we used that a lot", Friedkin recalls.

It was easier to film some of the other supernatural manifestations, such as the bed rocking and the curtains blowing, in Regan's room, since the walls and ceiling of the set were wild, or capable of being moved to accommodate a camera; after the scene where the ceiling cracks it was necessary to use a hard one. A hole was cut in the ceiling for the rig to go through when Regan levitates as the priests chant "The power of Christ compels you!", the most challenging shot in the sequence. the  Blair wore a bodysuit under her nightgown with attached hooks for monofilament wires.

Roizman said that while he had filmed similar scenes in television commercials, painting the wires to match the background so they would not show on camera was difficult on The Exorcist because of the changes in background. "We had to practically paint them frame by frame", he told the magazine. While most directors would have been satisfied to use editing to smooth out the scene, Friedkin wanted it in longer takes. Roizman's painting was so effective that it was unnecessary to apply any digital editing to that scene to prepare it for optical media release in the late 2000s.

Friedkin decided that he did not want any scenes in the movie to have "any kind of spooky lights that you typically saw in horror films", so all the lights in the bedroom come from a visible source. This was challenging because at one point one of the lamps lighting it falls on the floor, changing the way it had to be lit to preserve the impression of available light. At other times they flicker and dim, supposedly due to Pazuzu's influence. Lastly, at the end of the sequence, Friedkin wanted the lighting's mood to change, to "have an ethereal quality—a very soft, glowing, cool sort of thing" without any apparent change in its sources. "We tried, at that point, to work with absolutely no shadows in the room, using just bounce light—and I think we achieved the correct overall effect."

Since it was so necessary to hide the lights with such a small room and so many people in it both on and off camera, Roizman and his crew mostly used "inkies", small incandescent bulb lights usually used to accentuate objects within the frame, "hidden wherever we could find a place for one. We were constantly controlling them with dimmers, so that if someone got too close to one, we'd take it down." He recalls his gaffer at one point controlling four of them; as a joke he put sheet music in front of the man one day. Due to the low light used, it was necessary to use wide aperture settings in most of the interiors, not just Regan's room. "I shot 90 percent of the picture wide open, as usual."

The room's color scheme also worked to create the impression of black and white. The walls were a gray taupe, Regan's bedding a neutral beige, and the priests wore black. White, according to Roizman, would have been too dominant. "In toning everything down like this, the only real color in the room became the skin tones—an effect which I personally like very much", he said. "This sequence has an almost black and white feeling; yet, there is subtle color there."

Father Merrin's arrival scene
Father Merrin's arrival scene was filmed on Max von Sydow's first day on set. The scene where he steps out of a cab and stands in front of the MacNeil residence, silhouetted in a misty streetlamp's glow and staring up at a beam of light from a bedroom window, is one of the most famous scenes in the movie, used for film posters and home media release covers. It was inspired by René Magritte's 1954 painting Empire of Light (L'Empire des lumières).

Friedkin wanted to evoke visually the language Blatty used in the novel for this scene, likening Merrin to "a melancholy traveler frozen in time", standing next to a streetlight in the fog when he gets out of the cab. He gave the crew a full day to light the scene, using mainly arc lights and tripod-mounted "troopers", and boosting the brightness of the existing streetlamps. "After a great deal of trial and error, we filmed on the second night."

Roizman said of all the nighttime exterior shots in the film, Merrin's arrival was "the trickiest". In order to get the beam of light the way Friedkin wanted it, the crew had to take the window frame out of the facade they had attached to the house for filming, put it behind the window and then put the spotlight in between the window and frame. "[I]t was difficult to get that bright of a glow from a shaded window and we also had to hold a fog effect all the way down the street", Roizman said. "Of course—wouldn't you know—just as we were ready to shoot, the wind came up, which made it more difficult to keep the fog settled in." By working quickly, he and the camera crew were able to get the shot, with Friedkin finding the first take satisfactory. At the time Roizman recounted this, the film had not yet been released and, based on dailies he had seen during production (which he allowed were not shown under the best possible conditions), he might have overlit the scene out of fear of missing detail. "However, with proper printing, I'm sure it will come out dark enough."

Head spinning

The scenes where the possessed Regan's head rotates 180 degrees so that she appears to be looking directly backwards drew significant notice from audiences and critics when the film was released. "All I can tell you is that the way you think I did it is not the way we did it," Friedkin told Castle of Frankenstein at the time. Like other special effects in the film, it was performed live in front of the camera. A life-size animated dummy of the character was built, one so realistic that Blair felt uncomfortable in its presence.

Critic Mark Kermode says the scene's impact results from the audience not having expected it so soon after the crucifix scene. He believes its recurrence later in the film, during the exorcism scenes, was added on set since it is in neither the novel nor the screenplay. Blatty had argued against it, telling Friedkin "supernatural doesn't mean impossible", which led Friedkin to insert a shot of Karras, suggesting the scene might just be a hallucination. When audiences reacted strongly to it, Blatty said Friedkin had "prov[ed] me an idiot once again."

Special effects supervisor Marcel Vercoutere built the dummy, primarily of latex based on casts of Blair's body, with help from makeup artist Dick Smith. They tested its realism by putting it in the front seat of a New York City taxicab and, when enough people were looking, turning the head. They had given the dummy's face the capability to move and appear to speak, even adding a condom so its throat would bulge when speaking, but it still did not quite look real in the bedroom set. Then Roizman noted that unlike the other characters in the scene, it did not exhale, so its breath was not visible in the chilled air, and a tube was added for simulated breathing, which produced the requisite clouds of vapor.

Crucifix scene

The scene where the possessed Regan masturbates with a crucifix was filmed with Dietz playing the character since Blair was too young. To make it seem bloody, she struck it against a sponge soaked in stage blood that had been taped to her stomach. Dietz and Friedkin had a lengthy discussion before filming it about exactly how she was to move her arm. "[H]is method wasn't correct, well, anatomically speaking", she recalls. "We had this long discussion about the right way to jerk off and I showed him why a woman has to churn her wrist [more than a man does]."

As they were arguing about this, a photographer visiting the set was taking pictures of the two of them. When Friedkin saw this, he went over to the photographer, removed their film from the camera, and tore it up, then cleared the set so the two could consider the sensitive discussion privately. Dietz was appreciative of this display of control on his part. "He knew how to create an environment where horror actors would be at their best."

"This particular scene is the most thought about and talked about scene for the obvious reason that it programs two things that are generally not programmed up-front in the human mind ... sex and religion", Friedkin said at the time. It lasts only 50 seconds, yet to many viewers seems much longer, he noted. He had filmed much more, but ultimately decided, on his own without previewing it or consulting anyone, that it was about "how much I could take". While other directors might have used more (he joked that Russ Meyer might have made it the entire movie), "to me, it was worth about 50 seconds."

"Far from shying away from the sight, Friedkin puts it centre-screen, overlighting the entire sequence and accompanying the visuals with a truly revolting stabbing sound," writes Kermode. He quotes Blatty, who recalls Friedkin telling him that people would come to the film to see the crucifix scene more than any other. "At the time ... I thought he was destroying the film. But when I perceived that he was absolutely right, I thought it was terribly depressing."

Angiography scene

The angiography scene, in which a needle is inserted into Regan's neck and spurts blood, as Blair undergoes the steps of the actual procedure, caused audiences the most discomfort, according to Blatty, who himself admitted he never watched it when viewing the film. "I've learned over the years that [it's] the most terrifying scene", Friedkin said in 2015. "Medical science impinging upon the innocence of this little girl. Which is more disturbing than the demon."

It has been criticized as "unappetizing", the film's "most needless scene", and "revolting". British comedian Graeme Garden, who has a medical degree, agreed the scene was "genuinely disturbing" in his review for the New Scientist; he called it "the really irresponsible feature of this film".

"The camera pointedly does not express the horror of Regan's experience with modern medicine, it only records it, allowing the audience to take away from it what it will", writes critic John Kenneth Muir of this scene in Horror Films of the 1970s. "In some ways, the hospital interlude is the most terrifying scene in the film because it looks, sounds and feels totally real ... For a time, it is medicine that possesses Regan, not the Devil, it seems." Kermode says it "seems like an Inquisitional torture, perverse in its precision and horribly sexual in its execution."

In a 2021 article in the journal History of the Human Sciences, Amy C. Chambers of Manchester Metropolitan University similarly observes that "[t]he medical space is made spectacular and horrific in The Exorcist not through the presentation of Regan's behaviour or the demon, but through the clinical nature of her treatment and how this is communicated through shots and sound." She quotes Finnish media professor Frans Ilkka Mäyrä on how the scientific suggests the spiritual here: "The violent movements and noises of arteriographic machinery reach diabolical dimensions. The names of medication gain occult resonances: Ritalin, Librium."

Medical professionals have described the scene, not in the novel but added to the film to reflect changes in medical technology, as a realistic depiction of the procedure. It is also of historical interest in the field, as around the time of the film's release, radiologists had begun to stop using the carotid artery for the puncture (as they do in the film) in favor of a more distant artery. It has also been described as the most realistic depiction of a medical procedure in a popular film. In his 2012 commentary on the DVD release of the 2000 cut, Friedkin claimed that the scene was used as a training film for radiologists for years after the film's release.

Roizman recalled the challenges of filming the scene in his American Cinematographer interview. It was shot with limited time available on a Saturday afternoon, in one of the actual rooms used for the procedure. "The space was cramped and there was really no room for rigging lighting equipment, so I decided to shoot the whole thing with available light, which, in this case, meant fluorescent light." Unlike most of the other interiors in the film, that was more than enough light to be adequate and he was able to use a narrower aperture. Roizman's crew changed the light bulbs in the hallways so they would be the same color as those in the examining room. He was so pleased with the resulting footage that, for a later scene shot at a medical complex on Long Island, where they had more space and control, they again used the existing fluorescent lighting with just some color correction filters in the camera and exterior light from the shades to compensate. "[T]here was virtually no correction necessary in the lab, and the results were the best that I've ever had with fluorescents."

"Spider-walk" scene
Stuntwoman Ann Miles performed the spider-walk scene in November 1972, after having practiced it for two weeks. Vercoutere had designed a special harness, but she did not need it; as a former college gymnast at Florida State she was already a skilled enough contortionist on the first take. Friedkin cut it over Blatty's objection just prior to the premiere, since he thought it appeared too early in the film for such a drastic effect on Regan to be visible. Whether the scene had been shot at all was debated by fans for years afterwards—Friedkin denied having done so—until Kermode found the footage in Warners' archives while researching his book on the film in the mid-1990s. When he showed it to Friedkin, the director said he had probably forgotten filming the scene. It was restored to the 2000 director's cut, albeit with a "muddy, grainy" look that one critic said made the scene seem superfluous, using a different take showing Regan with blood flowing from her mouth.

Miles was not credited. Websites devoted to the film during the early 21st century gave credit to another contortionist, Sylvia Hager, who had been credited after the 2000 re-release. This confusion may have arisen from Vercourtere's website, where he credited her and described the harness he had designed that she supposedly wore to make the scene possible. He blamed the inability to erase it from the film for its exclusion. Miles has recalled that in reality Hager, her lighting double, was unable to perform the scene even with the harness, which Vercourtere had hoped to bring to market afterwards. Since she was able to do the spider walk without it, she believes he left her out of his account for commercial reasons. The misidentification, Miles said in 2018, cost her jobs afterwards since some producers believed she was falsely taking credit for Hager's work. Since then, after the intercession of SAG, she has been properly credited.

Special effects

The Exorcist has several special effects, engineered by makeup artist Smith. In one scene, Max von Sydow is actually wearing more makeup than Linda Blair, as Friedkin wanted some very detailed facial close-ups. The 44-year-old von Sydow was made up to look 30 years older. Many viewers did not realize he was made up at all, which Alan McKenzie calls "a tribute" to Smith; critic Pauline Kael, whose review of the film in The New Yorker was generally unfavorable, called it "one of the most convincing aging jobs I've ever seen" According to Friedkin, it took four hours to apply the makeup every morning. "Dick Smith just happens to be the best in the world", he says. He said that if there was a regular Academy Award for makeup, Smith would have received it.

For the look of the possessed Regan, Friedkin and Smith drew their inspiration from the crucifix scene. If she had injured herself masturbating with it, they reasoned, it was likely that under Pazuzu's control she might also have deliberately scourged her face. "[So we] decided to have the makeup grow out of self-inflicted wounds to the face that become gangrenous so that there was an organic reason for the change in her facial features, which might certainly be demonic possession, or self-immolation", Friedkin later explained.

A latex stomach was built for the scene where the words "HELP ME" appear to be written on the possessed Regan's body. The letters were scratched in, and then heated to make them disappear. This part of the process was filmed and then run backward in the edit so the letters seemed to be appearing in the finished film.

Post-production

Editing

Bud Smith, who had gotten to know Friedkin while he was working on Putney Swope and other films with Robert Downey Sr. during the production of The French Connection, recalls Friedkin calling and asking him to work on The Exorcist after shooting was done. Friedkin had already hired three other editors (Jordan Leonduopoulos, credited as "supervising editor", Norman Gay and Evan Lottman), but told Smith he would be the lead editor. Seeing how much film there was to edit, he asked Friedkin if he could take one large rack of footage and try cutting it. It was the Iraq sequence at the beginning of the film, and after Friedkin disliked his first attempt, Smith worked through a weekend to recut the footage to a rhythm based on the sound of a blacksmith hammering an anvil near where Father Merrin is having his tea, a change that the director liked more.

While working on the film, Smith also created a trailer for the film known as the "flash face" trailer. After starting with Merrin's arrival scene and a voiceover broadly explaining what is happening, it cuts to a montage of faces from various scenes in the film, still, all appearing in all-white against a black background, which quickly swells to almost all white and then fades back to nearly black, making a strobe-like effect, as tense string music plays, ending after almost a minute and a half with the title. Friedkin said in 2018 that Warners declined to use it as they feared it would scare audiences too much. He considers it the best trailer made for the film.

In his tweet discussing this, Friedkin referred to Smith as "the film's editor", although the other three were credited. During principal photography, the editor then hired had never worked on a movie before and was forbidden from making any cuts to the raw footage. After shooting wrapped, he hired Lottman and closely supervised his work as he began editing. "It was all about power," Lottman said. "He wanted to be in control of the film." All four shared the Academy Award nomination the film received for its editing.

Studio executives suggested transposing two scenes early in the film: Karras's confession to Father Tom in the bar that he believes he has lost his faith and his visit to his mother. Originally they came in that order, as in the script; by reversing them, critic Mark Kermode says, the film shows Karras's mother's predicament as a direct cause of his spiritual crisis. This created a slight continuity error: the scene following the bar confession, in which Chris goes up to the attic looking into the noises Regan has reported there seems in the film to take place in the morning but instead of wearing the morning dressing gown as she had earlier she is wearing the same heavy brown robe she wore when talking to Regan the night before.

A later scene, with Regan's first doctor visit ending in her being prescribed Ritalin, was cut by Friedkin because he felt the audience would be expecting that Regan's difficulties were the result of her possession and an additional medical examination would delay the film: "One of the things I was conscious of doing while editing The Exorcist was and not stop in one place anywhere, where the audience could say 'Oh wait a minute fella'". Blatty responds that as a result of cutting this scene, another slight plot issue was created by the later scene where Chris tells Regan she will be fine as long as she takes her pills, as without the doctor visit this is the first time the pills are mentioned.

Friedkin's final cut was 140 minutes long; despite his insistence that it was perfect, Warners insisted he trim the film to much closer to two hours to allow for more showings each day. Blatty was willing to fight for the whole film as it was, but over his objections Friedkin cut roughly 10–12 minutes. Some of the excluded scenes were among Blatty's favorites, including the original ending, with Dyer and Kinderman connecting and agreeing to go to the movies together at some point, and a scene where Karras and Merrin take a break from the exorcism and discuss the demon's motivation for possessing Regan on the MacNeil stairs. These scenes had been in Blatty's novel, and he believed that in the movie they made it clearer at the end that good had triumphed and what was at stake. Friedkin also cut the "spider-walk" scene early in the film, where the possessed Regan walks downstairs on her hands and feet, her face looking upwards, and harasses her mother's guests.

Sound effects
Special sound effects for the film were created by Ron Nagle, Doc Siegel, Gonzalo Gavira, and Bob Fine. Nagle spent two weeks recording animal sounds, including bees, dogs, hamsters, and pigs; these were incorporated into the multilayered mix of the demon's voice. Gavira achieved the sound effect of Regan's head rotating by twisting a leather wallet.

Friedkin was personally involved in the sound mixing, which took four months. It was the last aspect of the film completed prior to release, finished only right before deadline. Jim Nelson, who Friedkin had hired to supervise the mixing, recalls the director being particularly demanding during this time, treating his then-girlfriend, who was among those assisting in the process, "like a dog". Nelson himself recalls going from "having a seven-year contract as his associate producer to the guy he hated most in the world—in two minutes" after Friedkin overheard him telling Calley on the phone that the sound editors were "basically finished". Friedkin also used the time to solicit opinions on sections of the film from anyone uninvolved, particularly one janitor in the building, and if he liked it, he decided that portion of the film was done.

Alleged subliminal imagery

Wilson Bryan Key wrote a whole chapter on the film in his book Media Sexploitation, alleging repeated use of subliminal and semi-subliminal imagery and sound effects. Key observed the use of the Pazuzu face (which Key assumed was Jason Miller in death mask makeup). He claimed that the safety padding on the bedposts was shaped to cast phallic shadows on the wall and that a skull face is superimposed into one of Father Merrin's breath clouds. Key identified the pig squeals in the sound mix and gave his opinion of the subliminal intent.

A detailed 1991 article in Video Watchdog examined the phenomenon, providing still frames with several uses of subliminal "flashing" throughout the film. Friedkin told the authors, "I saw subliminal cuts in a number of films before I ever put them in The Exorcist, and I thought it was a very effective storytelling device ... The subliminal editing in The Exorcist was done for dramatic effect — to create, achieve, and sustain a kind of dreamlike state." In an interview for a 1999 book about the film, Blatty addressed the controversy by explaining that, "There are no subliminal images. If you can see it, it's not subliminal."

Titles
The editing of the title sequence was the first major project for the film title designer Dan Perri. Friedkin had sought him out after seeing his work on Electra Glide in Blue, before The Exorcist was even completed. "It took a long time to design the simplicity of what we wound up using due to experimenting as the film changed shape". Perri recalled. "As [Friedkin] was tightening and evolving the story it would affect how the opening took place."

When Friedkin played for Perri the music he wanted to use over the opening titles, that pushed the title designer further in the direction of having the titles be very simple. "On screen, the fewer the elements, the more important each becomes. So we're dealing with two elements: a screen that's black and type, the name of the film." The only other elements besides the title that had to be at the beginning of the film were the studio's name, and Blatty's and Friedkin's. The latter two were not on the best of terms at the time, according to Perri (Blatty had sued Friedkin and the studio almost two months before the film's release to make sure his name was included in the opening credits), which affected how he styled their names in the credits: "[Legally], their names had to be the same size but where Bill Blatty has three names, of course they had to be the same size." Perri first showed Friedkin a version in which both of them had their names in two-line stacks, but later changed it so Friedkin's name was on one line, to distinguish him slightly.

For the words themselves Perri chose to keep the Weiss Initials typeface that had been used on the cover of Blatty's novel. The consensus among the filmmakers was that the words had to be red. But choosing an exact shade took some more time. "When it's exposed against black it tends to, what's called, bloom. It swells, it glows, it's very hard to control. I had to do a lot of exposure tests just to get the right red that wouldn't bloom."

Perri's input into the film's opening continued after those credits, as the music abruptly shifts to an ululating male voice and the scene to the archeological dig site in northern Iraq. Friedkin told him he wanted the film to begin with a sunrise, even though he had not filmed one while there on location. The closest shot he had was one filmed at midday, of the sun in an orange sky, with rising heat visible. "I suggested that we create an implied sunrise and that's what's in the film now", Perri says, "a very, very long fade in, like a 30-second fade in of the sun in the sky but in black and white. It very slowly dissolves into color" That image gave the film the sense of beginning it had lacked.

The title design was carried over into prerelease marketing for The Exorcist. Perri designed a poster with the scene where Merrin seems to be confronting the Pazuzu statute entirely in silhouette, an orange sky behind them and the film's title in orange below. It was used as an international teaser poster. "That went out in six languages and they gave me the translation in each language and I set the type in the same style and I fortunately was able to supervise the printing—silk screened rather than lithography—and printed thousands of each and they were distributed around the world", Perri recalls.

As a result of the success of The Exorcist, Perri went on to design opening titles for a number of major films including Taxi Driver (1976), Star Wars (1977), and Gangs of New York (2002). In a 2019 article where Perri discussed how he worked with Friedkin to create the credits, the Art of the Title website observed that the disjuncture between Georgetown and Iraq, "two locations with an unclear connection", the title sequence enhances the film by keeping the audience off balance until Merrin arrives at the MacNeils in the last act. "The film asks its audience to hold ideas, timelines, and locations on the other side of the world in mind", the site says. "The importance of these varied narratives of the main characters in the film allows The Exorcist to extend the battle between good and evil beyond a family home in Georgetown, Washington and reveal the demons that lurk all around us."

Music
Friedkin rejected Lalo Schifrin's working score. The composer had written six minutes of music for the initial trailer but audiences were reportedly too scared by its combination of sights and sounds. According to Schifrin, Warner executives told Friedkin to instruct him to tone it down with softer music, but he never did; Schifrin disclosed in 2005 that he believes this was in retaliation for an earlier "incident" between the two that he declined to describe as he was already going against legal advice by saying that much. Schifrin denies claims he used his original Exorcist music several years later for The Amityville Horror. According to a 1998 documentary, Friedkin took the tapes that Schifrin had recorded and threw them away in the studio parking lot.

In his Castle of Frankenstein interview shortly after the film's release, Friedkin discussed the evolution of the film's music. He said he had hired a composer, whom he did not name, to write a score, "and he did a score all right, and I thought it was terrible, just overstated and dreadful." He decided instead to use the music he had given the composer as inspiration. "In other words, rather than get bad imitation Stravinsky, I might as well have the real thing."

Bernard Herrmann, famous for his scores for Orson Welles and Alfred Hitchcock, including the staccato string bursts that accompanied the killings in Psycho, was offered the opportunity to score the finished film. He was flown from London to New York, where he viewed a rough cut, and declined. He felt the minimal opening credits deprived a composer of the opportunity to establish a musical mood with an overture, and only Welles' Citizen Kane had been strong enough as a film to overcome that. In a 1975 interview with High Fidelity magazine, Herrmann said that Friedkin objected to his intention to use an organ in the score, saying "I don't want any Catholic music in my picture" and insisted on sharing credit with him for the music.

In the soundtrack liner notes for his 1977 film, Sorcerer, Friedkin said that if he had heard the music of Tangerine Dream earlier, then he would have had them score The Exorcist. Instead, he used modern classical compositions, including portions of the 1972 Cello Concerto No. 1, of Polymorphia, and other pieces by Polish composer Krzysztof Penderecki, Five Pieces for Orchestra by Austrian composer Anton Webern as well as some original music by Jack Nitzsche. The music was heard only during scene transitions. The 2000 "Version You've Never Seen" features new music by Steve Boeddeker, as well as brief source music by Les Baxter.

What is now considered the movie's theme, the piano-based melody which opens Tubular Bells, the 1973 debut album by English progressive rock musician Mike Oldfield, became very popular after the film's release, although Oldfield was not impressed with the way it was used. Friedkin recalled in 2015 that he had wanted something like Brahms' "Lullaby" with "a kind of childhood feel". He had gone to see Calley, who did not understand what the director wanted, but directed him to the nearby music library, where he found Oldfield's record, which Warners was not planning to release. "But I listened to that refrain, and it hooked me, and we won the rights to it" he said. "I think it sold 10 or 20 million records. And it was an accident."

There are 17 minutes of music in a film slightly over two hours long. Friedkin was satisfied. "What I wanted", he said, "what I think we have in the film, is understated music. The music is just a presence like a cold hand on the back of your neck, rather than assertive." In her ambivalent review of the film, critic Judith Crist praised the film's "sparing and adventurous" use of music.

In 1998 a restored and remastered soundtrack was released by Warner (without Tubular Bells) that included three pieces from Schifrin's rejected score. The pieces are "Music from the unused Trailer", an 11-minute "Suite from the Unused Score", and "Rock Ballad (Unused Theme)". That same year, the Japanese version of the original soundtrack LP did not include the Schifrin pieces but did include the main theme, and the movement titled Night of the Electric Insects from George Crumb's string quartet Black Angels. Waxwork Records released the score in 2017 on two different variations of 180-gram vinyl, "Pazuzu" with clear and black smoke and "Exorcism" that featured blue and black smoke. The record was remastered from the original tapes; it included liner notes from Friedkin with art by Justin Erickson from Phantom City Creative.

The Greek song playing on the radio when Father Karras leaves his mother's house is "Paramythaki mou" (My Tale), sung by Giannis Kalatzis. Lyricist Lefteris Papadopoulos said that a few years later, when he was in financial difficulties, he asked for some compensation. Part of Hans Werner Henze's 1966 composition Fantasia for Strings is played over the closing credits.

Production difficulties and purported curse on film

Principal photography began in August 1972; it was scheduled to last 105 days. Due to production problems and accidents on set, it took over 200 days to wrap. As a result, the film went $2.5 million ($ in modern dollars) over budget, ultimately costing the studio $12 million ($ in modern dollars) to make.

Early on, the set in New York for the interiors of the MacNeil house was destroyed by a fire started when a bird flew into a circuit breaker, with the exception of Regan's room, which remained unharmed. Production was delayed for six weeks while it was rebuilt. Later, another set was severely damaged when the sprinkler system activated. A two-week delay resulted when the  statue of Pazuzu was shipped to Hong Kong instead of Iraq.

Injuries to cast and crew also affected production, and had permanent consequences. Burstyn's back injury during the scene where the possessed Regan throws Chris backwards before the head-spinning, the take used in the film, left her unable to film for two weeks and using crutches for the remainder of the production; the coccyx fracture she suffered has caused her continuing problems since it was inadequately treated at the time; in 2018 she described it as "a permanent companion".

Blair also injured her back, fracturing her lower spine after being too loosely strapped to the bed when it was being rocked; the take was also used in the finished film. She developed scoliosis as a result: "[It] was far more serious than I ever imagined and really affected my health negatively for a long time." She further developed a lifelong aversion to cold due to having to spend so much time in the refrigerated bedroom set wearing only a nightgown and long underwear. A carpenter cut his thumb off and a lighting technician similarly lost a toe in another accident.

There were also more deaths among people connected with the film and their family members. Among the cast, MacGowran died a week after completing his scenes as Dennings with the character's death; Maliaros also passed away, like her character, before the film was finished. Deaths among or close to the crew included the night watchman and the operator of the refrigeration system for Regan's room, along with the assistant cameraman's newborn child.

Blair's grandfather died during the first week of production, and von Sydow had to return to Sweden after his first day on set shooting the entrance scene after he learned that his brother had died, adding another delay to the production. Miller's son Jason Patric nearly died when, while he and his father were out at the beach, a motorcycle that unexpectedly appeared struck him, leaving him in critical condition and requiring weeks in intensive care to heal from the injuries. Several years after the film's release, Paul Bateson, the radiological technician in the angiography scene, was convicted of murder in the death of journalist Addison Verrill; in 2015 Hatra, the World Heritage Site where the prologue had been shot, was demolished by ISIL militants.

Friedkin believed that there might have been some supernatural interference with the film. "I'm not a convert to the occult", he told the horror-film magazine, Castle of Frankenstein, "but after all I've seen on this film, I definitely believe in demonic possession ... We were plagued by strange and sinister things from the beginning." He said some striking visuals in the film had not been intended and could not be explained.

Vercourtere, the special effects supervisor, also felt uncomfortable working on the film. "There was definitely a feeling something [bad] could happen," he recalled. "I felt I was playing around with something I shouldn't be playing around with." Concern among the production was significant enough that Friedkin asked Father Thomas Bermingham, the film's technical advisor (who also played Georgetown's president in the film), to perform an exorcism on the set. Bermingham instead blessed the cast and crew, believing that an actual exorcism would only make the cast more anxious.

British film historian Sarah Crowther believes stories of the curse were partly disseminated by Warner's marketing department, which she believes was purposely courting controversy by releasing the film just after Christmas. "[They] spread speculation of the curse prior to release. It was an extremely hot topic in global media when it hit cinemas", she told inews.com in 2018, likening the curse to the elaborate marketing gimmicks employed by producer William Castle to stimulate viewer interest in his horror films during the 1960s.

Blair told Kermode in 1989 that stories of the supposed curse may have circulated because it helped viewers deal with the movie. "They chose to see a scary film, and maybe they wanted to believe all those rumors because it helped the whole process", she said. "Maybe they wanted to believe weird things happened because it helped them to be scared."

Crowther believes most of the aspects of the curse are really just the result of Friedkin's driving, relentless production over a prolonged period, which fatigued many members of the cast and crew. Blatty agreed, telling Kermode that Friedkin had started the "curse" story with an interview during production in which he blamed "devils" for the film's many delays. "But for God's sake", said Blatty, "if you shoot something for a year, people are going to get hurt, people are going to die ... these things just happen."

In 2000, Blatty joked that "There is no Exorcist curse. I am The Exorcist curse!" when asked if the death of Blair's pet mouse was possibly due to it.

Releases

Theatrical

Warners scheduled The Exorcist for release the day after Christmas in 1973. Originally it had been scheduled for an earlier release, but that was postponed due to postproduction delays. Friedkin was, even years later, angry about this choice of release date, believing that it hurt the film at the box office. He had wanted a release before the holiday, or on it, as is more common at the time of year; it has been speculated that Warners wanted to avoid any controversy that might have come from releasing a film about demonic possession before a major religious holiday. Friedkin supposedly had seen what Paramount had done to make The Godfather, which had had similar issues, a runaway success a year and a half before and had wanted Warners to emulate it with a more preferable release date, such as March, as that film had had.

The post-holiday release served to help The Exorcist sell tickets, as most moviegoers had all or most of the week off to go see it. It is the second all-time highest-grossing Christmas week release after 1997's Titanic. It has also outgrossed The Godfather. Ultimately it played on screens for 105 weeks, or just over two years.

In 1979, the film was re-released theatrically and was converted to 70mm, with its original 1.75:1 aspect ratio expanded to 2.20:1 to use the extra screen width. A longer cut labeled "The Version You've Never Seen" (later re-labeled "Extended Director's Cut") was released theatrically in 2000, with additions and changes.

Home media

Special edition 25th anniversary VHS and DVD release
A limited 50,000-copy special edition box set was released in 1998 for the film's 25th anniversary on both VHS and DVD. It includes the original ending as a special feature.

Blatty was pleased that the scene was restored. The night before the scene was shot, he and Friedkin had worked very hard on blocking it, to make sure it would be clear to the audience that the film ended on an upbeat moment. "My theory over the years has been that at that point in the movie, most of the audience is a little out of it" he said two years later. "They're really not seeing what's happening there, and, of course, the film lost its original ending and instead ended with Father Dyer looking down the steps ... [which] gives an audience an emotional cue about how they're supposed to feel." Overall, he said, the 25th anniversary cut is "the version that I first saw on the moviola in the editing room all those years ago, and it's the way it ought to be seen."

The DVD also contains The Fear of God, a documentary on the making of the film.

DVD features
 The original film with restored film and digitally remastered audio, with a 1.85:1 widescreen aspect ratio.
 An introduction by Friedkin.
 The 1998 BBC documentary The Fear of God: The Making of "The Exorcist".
 Two audio commentaries.
 Interviews with Friedkin and Blatty.
 Theatrical trailers and TV spots.

Box set features
 A commemorative 52-page tribute book, covering highlights of the film's preparation, production, and release; features previously unreleased historical data and archival photographs.
 Limited edition soundtrack CD of the film's score, including the original (unused) soundtrack ("Tubular Bells" and "Night of the Electric Insects" omitted).
 Eight lobby card reprints.
 Exclusive senitype film frame (magnification included).

Other home media

The extended edition labeled "The Version You've Never Seen" (released theatrically in 2000) was released on DVD in 2001. It was re-released on DVD (and Blu-ray) with slight alterations as the "Extended Director's Cut" in 2010.

In a 2008 DVD Review interview, Friedkin said he was scheduled to begin work on The Exorcist Blu-ray that year. When released two years later, it featured a restored version of both cuts. A 40th Anniversary Edition Blu-ray was released in 2013, with both cuts, many of the previously released bonus features and two featurettes about Blatty. The Exorcist: The Complete Anthology, a box set, was released on DVD in 2006, and on Blu-ray in 2014. It includes both cuts, the sequels Exorcist II: The Heretic and The Exorcist III, and the prequels Exorcist: The Beginning and Dominion: Prequel to the Exorcist.

, The Exorcist is available for streaming to subscribers of FuboTV, HBO Max and Vudu. It can be bought or rented from Amazon Prime Video, Google Play, Philo and YouTube.

Reception

Box office
Since it was a horror film that had gone well over budget and did not have any major stars in the lead roles, Warner did not have high expectations for The Exorcist. It did not preview the film for critics and booked its initial release for only 30 screens in 24 theaters, mostly in 21 large cities and their metropolitan areas. The film grossed $1.9 million ($ in modern dollars) in its first week, setting house records in each theater, with an average of $70,000, equivalent to $300,000 at modern ticket prices.

Within its first month it had grossed $7.4 million nationwide, ($ in modern dollars) by which time Warners' executives expected it to easily surpass My Fair Ladys $34 million take to become the studio's most financially successful film. The huge crowds attracted to the film forced the studio to expand it into wide release very quickly, to 366 screens. At the time that releasing strategy had rarely been used for anything but exploitation films. Many of the theaters in large cities were not located near downtowns, where Warners had booked Magnum Force, the Dirty Harry sequel, before planning the release of The Exorcist. In February it accounted for 15 percent of all Warners' grosses in key markets.

None of the theaters were in Black neighborhoods such as South Central Los Angeles since the studio did not expect that audience to take much interest in the film, which had no Black characters. But after the theater in predominantly white Westwood that had shown the film was overwhelmed with moviegoers from South Central, it was quickly booked into theaters in that neighborhood. Black American enthusiasm for The Exorcist has been credited with ending mainstream studio support for blaxploitation movies, since Hollywood realized that Black audiences would flock to films that did not have content specifically geared to them.

The New York Times took notice that the audience lined up to see the film was between one-quarter and one-third Black at one theater on the Upper East Side of Manhattan, a mostly white neighborhood of the city, showing the film in late January. "A lot of blacks relate to voodoo and witchcraft and that kind of devil stuff," one Black patron said, when asked why so many Black people were sufficiently attracted to the film to go to such lengths to see it. "Many still believe in black magic, especially those from Haiti and the Deep South."

The Exorcist earned $66.3 million ($ in modern dollars) in distributors' rentals during its theatrical release in 1974 in the United States and Canada, becoming the second most popular film of that year (trailing The Sting which earned $68.5 million) and Warners' highest-grossing film of all time. The high returns were made possible by the use of four-wall distribution, where the contract provides that the studio rents the theater from the owner and thus keeps all the ticket revenue, in the initial run. It was the first time a major studio had used that practice. Warners also used some practices that had made The Godfather successful for Paramount the year before, such as making theaters commit to showing the film for at least 24 weeks.

Overseas, the film earned rentals of $46 million for a worldwide total of $112.3 million ($ in modern dollars). It became the highest-grossing film in Japan with rentals of over $8.2 million in its first 11 weeks. After several reissues, the film has grossed $232.6 million in the United States and Canada, which when adjusted for inflation, makes it the ninth highest-grossing film of all time in the U.S. and Canada and the top-grossing R-rated film of all time. , it has grossed $441 million worldwide, or $1.8 billion adjusted for inflation by 2014.

In Easy Riders, Raging Bulls, journalist and film historian Peter Biskind wrote about Warner's reaction to the success of the film. Executives were happy, but also nervous, since the huge earnings meant that the more free-wheeling and experimental parts of what the studio had done would become limited in favor of a focus on finding profitable film ideas and projects.

Critical response
Stanley Kauffmann, in The New Republic, wrote, "This is the scariest film I've seen in years—the only scary film I've seen in years ... If you want to be shaken—and I found out, while the picture was going, that that's what I wanted—then The Exorcist will scare the hell out of you". Arthur D. Murphy of Variety noted that it was "an expert telling of a supernatural horror story  ... The climactic sequences assault the senses and the intellect with pure cinematic terror". In the horror-film magazine Castle of Frankenstein, Joe Dante, later director of Piranha and The Howling, called it "an amazing film, and one destined to become at the very least a horror classic. [It] will be profoundly disturbing to all audiences, especially the more sensitive and those who tend to 'live' the movies they see ... Suffice it to say, there has never been anything like this on the screen before".

Roger Ebert of the Chicago Sun-Times gave the film a complete four-star review, praising the actors (particularly Burstyn) and the convincing special effects, but at the end of the review wrote: "I am not sure exactly what reasons people will have for seeing this movie; surely enjoyment won't be one, because what we get here aren't the delicious chills of a Vincent Price thriller, but raw and painful experience. Are people so numb they need movies of this intensity in order to feel anything at all?" Ebert, while praising the film, believed the special effects to be unusually graphic. He wrote: "That it received an R rating and not the X is stupefying".

In the middle of the range of critical response was Judith Crist. Her review in New York called the film "half-successful". She praised Friedkin's direction, its "to-the-point performances" and the special effects and makeup. But she felt that Blatty, in adapting his novel, had taken out the things that made the reader connect with the characters, and was perhaps limited by the fact that the film could not leave things to the imagination the way the book had.

Kael called the film "shallowness that asks to be taken seriously" saying its main problem was being too faithful to the novel as Blatty had intended it. Vincent Canby, writing in The New York Times, dismissed The Exorcist as "a chunk of elegant occultist claptrap ... a practically impossible film to sit through ... [e]stablish[ing] a new low for grotesque special effects." Andrew Sarris of The Village Voice complained that "Friedkin's biggest weakness is his inability to provide enough visual information about his characters ... Whole passages of the movie's exposition were one long buzz of small talk and name droppings ... The Exorcist succeeds on one level as an effectively excruciating entertainment, but on another, deeper level it is a thoroughly evil film". Writing in Rolling Stone, Jon Landau felt the film was "nothing more than a religious porn film, the gaudiest piece of shlock this side of Cecil B. DeMille (minus that gentleman's wit and ability to tell a story)." Film Quarterlys Michael Dempsey called The Exorcist "the trash bombshell of 1973, the aesthetic equivalent of being run over by a truck ... a gloating, ugly exploitation picture." The San Francisco Bay Guardians reviewer called it "quite simply the dumbest, most insultingly anti-intellectual movie I have ever come across".

English film critic Mark Kermode named it his "favorite film of all time".

Audience reaction

Audience members screamed and ran out of the theater during the only sneak preview. When it was over, Calley and the other Warners executives, instead of leaving without comment as studio executives usually do after those events, remained in their seats, stunned. "What in the fuck did we just see?" Calley asked. They believed the film was brilliant, but did not know how to market it, and decided on the limited early release after Christmas, with a trade screening on December 21. Burstyn recalled watching television the morning the film opened of viewers in Montreal lining up at 4 a.m. in frigid temperatures. "I thought, how can a movie have that kind of impact before it even opens? I just couldn't believe it."

Despite its mixed reviews and the controversies over its content and viewer reaction, The Exorcist was a runaway hit. In New York City, where its initial run was limited to a few theaters, patrons endured cold as severe as  sometimes with rain and sleet, waiting for hours in long lines during what is normally a slow time of year for the movies to buy tickets, many not for the first time. The crowds gathered outside theaters sometimes rioted, and police were called in to quell disturbances in not only New York but Kansas City.

The New York Times asked some of those in line what drew them there. Those who had read the novel accounted for about a third; they wanted to see if the film could realistically depict some of the scenes in the book. Others said: "We're here because we're nuts and because we wanted to be part of the madness". A repeat viewer told the newspaper that it was the best horror film he had seen in decades, "much better than Psycho. You feel contaminated when you leave the theater. There's something that is impossible to erase". Many made a point of saying that they had either never waited in line that long for a movie before, or not in a long time. "It makes the movie better," William Hurt, then a drama student at Juilliard, said of the experience. "The more you pay for something, the more it's worth."

Reports of strong audience reactions were widespread. Many viewers fainted; a woman in London, when the film opened there, reportedly fainted before the film even began. A woman in New York was said to have miscarried during a showing. One man at another showing lasted only 20 minutes before he had to be carried out on a stretcher.

Nausea was the most commonly reported reaction. "We have a plumber practically living here now", said the manager of Toronto's University Theater on Bloor Street, at the time selling its 1,440 seats out four times a day. "The smell in the bathrooms is awful. People are rushing in and they're missing the toilet seat by inches." Viewers seemed to be particularly disturbed by the crucifix scenes; the theater reported depleting its supply of smelling salts. Many patrons left before the end or waited for viewing companions in the lobby; the smell of marijuana smoke was also common although the police stationed at the theater reported no arrests. A reviewer for Cinefantastique said that there was so much vomit in the bathroom at the showing he attended that it was impossible to reach the sinks. Some theaters have been said to have provided "Exorcist barf bags"; while there are no contemporary reports of any even providing regular sickness bags, Mad magazine depicted one on the cover of its October 1974 issue, which contained a parody of the film.

Other theaters arranged for ambulances to be on call; in Toronto the University said it had once required four in one night. Some patrons had to be helped after showings to leave the places they had hidden. Despite its lack of any supernatural content, many audience members found the angiography, where blood spurts from the tube inserted into Regan's neck, to be the film's most unsettling scene (Blatty said he only watched it once, while the film was being edited, and avoided it on every other viewing). Friedkin speculates that it is easier to empathize with Regan in that scene, as compared to what she suffers while possessed later in the film.

Some Catholic viewers experienced spiritual crises as a result of seeing the film. Many priests reported being called to minister to parishioners, some of whom had lapsed in their faith, who had been distraught by the film. A man in Denver walked out of a showing into the nearby Cathedral of the Immaculate Conception half-naked and so disturbed that it took two priests, several attendants and the police to get him into it. A teenage girl in New Jersey stayed up all night with her parents saying the Rosary with her parents after seeing the film but still needed to be reassured by a priest before she could sleep; even some priests themselves had similar issues. Many parishes reported callers who believed that they or a loved one was possessed and inquiring about how to arrange an exorcism. The Rev. Richard Woods, a professor at Loyola of Chicago, said most of the calls he got were from lapsed Catholics for whom the film resurfaced their religious education prior to Vatican II. "It stirs up memories of all those descriptions of hell that you got from nuns," he said.

In 1975, The Journal of Nervous and Mental Disease published a paper by a psychiatrist documenting four cases of what he called "cinematic neurosis" triggered by viewing the film. In all he believed the neurosis was already present and merely triggered by viewing scenes in the film, particularly those depicting Regan's possession. He recommended that treating physicians view the movie with their patient to help him or her identify the sources of their trauma.

Other causes were suggested outside the psychiatric context. One writer at Castle of Frankenstein took note of Friedkin's pride in the movie's sound, which theaters played at maximum volume, and wondered if some of the low frequencies had induced or amplified feelings of dread or uneasiness in patrons. Another writer there blamed the reactions on the mainstream audience's general unfamiliarity with horror cinema and its conventions. "We have all no doubt heard of people who stood in line for four hours to see this movie, then threw up in mid-film and walked out," he wrote. "I can't say for sure, but my guess is that these people hadn't gone to see a monster movie since 1935."

"The Exorcist ... was one of the rare horror movies that became part of the national conversation", wrote Zinoman almost 40 years later: "It was a movie you needed to have an opinion about". Three separate production histories were published. Journalists complained that coverage of the film and its controversies was distracting the public from the ongoing Watergate scandal. Much of the coverage focused on the audience which, in the words of film historian William Paul, "had become a spectacle equal to the film". Paul cited an Associated Press cartoon in which a couple trying to purchase tickets to the film was told that while the film itself is sold out, "we're selling tickets to the lobby to watch the audience." He did not think any other film's audience has received as much coverage as The Exorcists.

Religious response

"One of the best things that could happen is if the Pope denounces it", Friedkin told an interviewer the month after The Exorcist was released. Some of the film's content, such as the crucifix scene, involved acts and utterances that were specifically sacrilegious from a Catholic perspective. Officially the Church, whose influence over the content of films had declined following the demise of the Hays Office and the associated Production Code a few years earlier, had bemoaned Warners' decision to release it immediately following Christmas. The United States Conference of Catholic Bishops' Office for Film and Broadcasting, through its publication the Catholic Film Newsletter rated the film A-IV, suitable for adults only with reservations, and gave it a generally negative review that faulted the film for suggesting exorcisms were common and possibly encouraging belief in the occult and Satanism.

Individual priests familiar with the underlying theology also faulted the film. A priest who, like Karras, was a Jesuit and psychiatrist at Georgetown said that while he believed in the Devil "there is no shred of evidence from the Bible that he can possess an individual." Woods, the Loyola of Chicago professor, who had written a book about the Devil, told The New York Times that Karras and Merrin were incompetent exorcists. "They departed from the ritual in the most stupid and reckless manner," he said. "They tried to fight the Demon hand to hand instead of relying on the power of God." Eugene Kennedy, another Loyola priest and psychologist, described the film's view of the battle of good and evil as "immature ... Being a Christian and a mature person means coming to terms with our own capacity for evil, not projecting it on an outside force that possesses us."

Critics of the movie's depiction of Catholicism were not limited to the Church. "Surely it is the religious people who should be most offended by this movie", wrote Kael, incredulous that Georgetown and several priests facilitated the production:

Kael had nonetheless also described The Exorcist as "the biggest recruiting poster the Catholic Church has had since the sunnier days of Going My Way and The Bells of St. Mary's" since the film "says that [it] is the true faith, feared by the Devil, and that its rituals can exorcise demons." A later historian has found that the Church was not as critical of the film as media coverage at the time suggested. Privately it considered the film to be faith-affirming. Authorities in Tunisia banned the film before its release there in 1975 as "unjustified propaganda in favor of Christianity". In 2008, Colleen McDannell, editor of Catholics In The Movies, wrote that "The Exorcist is a horror movie that believes in its villain and, even worse, recruits its villain as a witness to Catholic truth."

In February 1974, the Jesuit magazine America ran several commentaries and responses by priests to the film, some of which reiterated criticisms already made. The editors allowed Blatty to publish a response later that month. He praised some of the commentators' points, "[b]ut I am truly dismayed at the misconceptions held, not only by critics, but also defenders of the novel and film. And when I see that they are Jesuits, whom I thanked on the acknowledgement page of my novel for 'teaching me to think,' I can only conclude that the fault must be mine, and that what I thought obvious, was not."

The changes to the film's ending from the novel, Blatty agreed, might have made it harder to perceive that "the mystery of goodness" was the theme of the work, since it appeared to many viewers, including some of those who had written in the magazine, that the film ended with the demon triumphant through the deaths of the priests even if it had been successfully exorcised from Regan. The ending of the novel made this theme clearer, but even in the film he saw Karras's suicide as a sacrificial act of love that reaffirmed his faith in death. Blatty also corrected the misapprehension, common at the time, that the spirit possessing Regan was Satan, noting that it was explicitly named as Pazuzu in the novel, and implied strongly in the film to be him. "True, Regan tells Fr. Karras, 'And I'm the devil.'" he conceded. "But what constrains us to believe her? Believe that and you perforce must believe everything the demon has to say, including the accusation that Fr. Merrin is a homosexual." Lastly he responded to Woods' criticism of the absence of temptation as a theme in the film by saying that he chose not to explore that because not only did he see that focus as "naive, mistaken and an excuse for evasion of confrontation with personal guilt" but that he instead saw the Devil's greatest weapon against humanity to be "the inducement of despair."

American Protestant groups also took note of the Exorcist phenomenon and its religious implications. At first their response was negative. Evangelist Billy Graham told the National Enquirer that he was afraid to watch it, saying that "the Devil is in every frame of that film", a remark later characterized as Graham believing the print itself to be possessed. He called it "spiritual pornography, pandering to man's innate superstition."

The Rev. Lester Kinsolving, an Episcopal priest who wrote a widely syndicated newspaper column on religion, chastised the Catholic Church for granting its approval, saying incorrectly that it had given the film an A-III rating only because its heroes were priests. The Christian Century, the leading voice of mainline Protestantism, likewise denounced the film as "hardcore pornography [that to Protestants offers] a completely impossible solution" to evil. Protestant groups around the country picketed the film and offered support to those who might be disturbed by it, distributing leaflets with church contact information to filmgoers waiting in line.

Rating controversy
The Motion Picture Association of America's (MPAA) ratings board had been established several years before to replace the Motion Picture Production Code after it expired in 1968. It had already been criticized for its indirect censorship—as many as a third of the films submitted to it had had to be recut after being rated X, meaning no minors could be admitted. Since many theaters would not show such films, and newspapers would not run ads for them, the X rating greatly limited a non-pornographic film's commercial prospects.

While Friedkin wanted more blood and gore in The Exorcist than had been in any Hollywood film previously, he also needed the film to have an R rating (children admitted only with an adult) to reach a large audience. He believes that part of the reason for Warners' decision to open the film in limited release was the studio's certainty that the film would be rated X, severely attenuating its commercial prospects. Before release, Aaron Stern, the head of the MPAA ratings board, decided to watch the film himself before the rest of the board did. He then called Friedkin and said that since The Exorcist was "an important film", he would allow it to receive an R rating without any cuts.

Some critics, both anticipating and reacting to reports of the film's effect on children who might be or had been taken to see it, questioned the R rating. While he had praised the film, Roy Meacham, a critic for Metromedia television stations based in Washington, D.C., wrote in The New York Times in February 1974 that he had strongly cautioned that children should not be allowed to see it even with an adult, a warning his station repeated for several days. Nevertheless, some had, and he had heard of one girl being taken from the theater in an ambulance.

In Washington, the film drew strong interest as well since it was a rare film set in the area that did not involve government activity. The children Meacham saw leaving showings, he recalled, "were drained and drawn afterward; their eyes had a look I had never seen before". He suggested that the ratings board had somehow yielded to pressure from Warner not to give the film an X rating, and was skeptical of MPAA head Jack Valenti's claims that since the film had no sex or nudity, it could receive an R. After a week in Washington's theaters, Meacham recalled, authorities cited the crucifix scene to invoke a local ordinance that forbid minors from seeing any scenes with sexual content even where the actors were fully clothed; police warned theaters that staff would be arrested if any minors were admitted to see The Exorcist.

"The review board [has] surrendered all right to the claim that it provides moral and ethical leadership to the movie industry", Meacham wrote. He feared that, as a result, communities across the country would feel it necessary to pass their own, perhaps more restrictive, laws regarding the content of movies that could be shown in their jurisdictions: "For if the movie industry cannot provide safeguards for minors, authorities will have to." In The New Yorker, Kael echoed his insinuations that the board had yielded to studio pressure in rating the film R: "If The Exorcist had cost under a million or been made abroad, it would almost certainly be an X film. But when a movie is as expensive as this one, the [board] doesn't dare give it an X".

Two communities, Boston and Hattiesburg, Mississippi, attempted to prevent the film from being shown outright in their jurisdictions. A court in the former city blocked the ban, saying the film did not meet the U.S. Supreme Court's standard of obscenity. Nonetheless, in Boston the authorities told theaters they could not admit any minors despite the R rating. In Mississippi, the theater chain showing the movie was convicted at trial, but the state's Supreme Court overturned the conviction in 1976, finding that the state's obscenity statute was too vague to be enforceable in the wake of the Supreme Court's 1972 Miller v. California decision which laid down a new standard for obscenity.

There was also concern that theaters were not strictly enforcing the R rating, or even enforcing it at all, allowing unaccompanied minors to view the film. Times critic Lawrence Van Gelder reported that a 16-year-old girl in California said that not only was she sold a ticket to see the film unaccompanied, others who seemed even younger were able to do so as well. On the other hand, another Times writer, Judy Lee Klemesrud, said she saw no unaccompanied minors, and indeed very few minors, when she went to see the film in Manhattan. Nevertheless, "I think that if a movie ever deserved an X rating simply because it would keep the kids out of the theater, it is The Exorcist".

In 1974, Stern's tenure as chairman of the MPAA ratings board ended. His replacement, Richard Heffner, asked during the interview process about films with controversial ratings, including The Exorcist, said: "How could anything be worse than this? And it got an R?" After he took over as head, he would spearhead efforts to be more aggressive with the X rating, especially over violence in films.

Viewing restrictions in United Kingdom

The Exorcist was released in London in March 1974. The film drew protests around Britain from the Nationwide Festival of Light (NFL), a Christian public action group concerned with the influence of media on society, and especially on the young. Members of local clergy and concerned citizens handed out leaflets to those queuing to see the film, offering spiritual support afterwards to those who asked for it. A letter-writing campaign to local councils by the NFL led many to screen The Exorcist before permitting it to be shown in their districts. It was thus banned in some areas, such as Dinefwr Borough and Ceredigion in Wales.

The Exorcist was available on home video from 1981 in the UK. After the passage of the Video Recordings Act 1984, the film was submitted to the British Board of Film Classification for a home video certificate. James Ferman, the board's director, vetoed the decision to grant it over a majority vote. He believed that, even with a proposed 18 certificate, the film's notoriety would entice underage viewers to seek it out. As a result, all video copies of The Exorcist were withdrawn in the UK in 1988 and could not be purchased for 11 years.

Following a successful 1998 theatrical re-release, the film was submitted for home video release again in 1999. It was passed uncut with an 18 certificate, signifying a relaxation of the censorship rules for home video in the UK, in part due to Ferman's departure. Channel 4 showed The Exorcist on broadcast television in the UK for the first time in 2001.

Since release
The Exorcist set box office records that stood for many years. For almost half a century, until the 2017 adaptation of Stephen King's It, it was the top-grossing R-rated horror film. In 1999, The Sixth Sense finally bested The Exorcist as the highest-grossing supernatural horror film; it remains in third place after It claimed that title as well. On both charts The Exorcist, along with The Blair Witch Project, are the only 20th-century releases in the top 10.

Since its release, The Exorcists critical reputation has grown considerably. According to the review aggregator website Rotten Tomatoes, 84% of critics have given the film a positive review based on 84 reviews, with an average rating of 8.30/10. The site's critics consensus states: "The Exorcist rides its supernatural theme to magical effect, with remarkable special effects and an eerie atmosphere, resulting in one of the scariest films of all time". At Metacritic, which assigns and normalizes scores of critic reviews, the film has a weighted average score of 82 out of 100 based on 20 critics, indicating "universal acclaim". Chicago Tribune film critic Gene Siskel placed it in the top five films released that year. BBC film critic Mark Kermode believes the film to be the best film ever made.

Director Martin Scorsese placed The Exorcist on his list of the 11 scariest horror films of all time. Other filmmakers, including Stanley Kubrick, Robert Eggers, Alex Proyas and David Fincher also have cited The Exorcist as one of their favorite films. The musician Elton John listed it in his five favorite films of all time. In 2008, the film was selected by Empire as one of The 500 Greatest Movies Ever Made. It was also placed on a similar list of a thousand films by The New York Times. John Carpenter listed The Exorcist as one of his top eight scariest horror classics and listed the film as an influence in his 1980 supernatural horror film The Fog.

When the film was re-released theatrically in 2000 as "The Version You've Never Seen", some critics reconsidered whether it was still capable of affecting contemporary audiences, since it had been so widely imitated and emulated by other films since then. The Hartford Courants Malcolm Johnson described it as a "somewhat creaky antique [that] ... in some ways, feels a little old hat in 2000." Some scenes, such as Ritalin being proposed as a treatment for Regan, provoked laughter from modern audiences that had not been intended in 1973. But the film's performances were still effective, and the longer version made the medical professionals seem like "witch doctors".

But the Tribune found it "even better than it was in 1973 ... it actually seems a deeper movie now." Friedkin, who had seemed an odd choice to direct at the time, now seemed to have been the best. "[He] made the story real—and more terrifying", critic Michael Wilmington wrote. "[He] knows how to make the improbable real, how to convey a convincing atmosphere of modern chaos and dread."

Critical and scholarly analysis and commentary

The Exorcists surprising commercial success has evoked critical ponderings over its deeper social resonance. Many of those critics have mentioned the anxiety of the American population over developments at the time, just after the cultural, political and social upheavals of the late 1960s. "The Exorcist communicates an image of a United States in an unstable state of change that can no longer avoid its real and historical systemic evils", writes Amy Chambers. Kermode similarly noted that by stylistically distancing itself from the more Gothic horror films that had dominated the genre in the 1960s, the film "presented a credible portrait of the modern urban world ripped apart by an obscene, ancient evil." 

Stephen King, whose horror novels would sell well in the wake of the film and generate film adaptations of their own (one of which, the 2017 version of It, would eventually dethrone The Exorcist as the all-time highest-grossing R-rated horror film), calls The Exorcist "a social horror film if there ever was one" in his 1983 treatise on the genre, Danse Macabre. He sees the possessed Regan symbolizing for middle-aged viewers the outspoken, often profane youth protesting the Vietnam War and other social injustices, and speculates that the absence of that phenomenon from West Germany during that era may explain why the film did not perform as well there as it did in other countries (whereas the later Dawn of the Dead was extremely successful, coming as it did after an era characterized by youth-led terrorist activity such as Baader-Meinhof Gang). Danny Peary likewise notes the symbolic and real fragmentation throughout the film, from the dig-site workers breaking up rocks in the first scene to Chris's fraught relationship with her ex-husband and Karras's drift from his faith: "With the world in such disorder, the Devil can make a dramatic entrance."

More specifically, at the time of the film's release, the Watergate scandal was growing more serious, implicating President Richard Nixon and the subject of regular daily news coverage. "Maybe, between that and Vietnam, people were newly awake to a certain kind of pervading societal rot, something that the spectacle of The Exorcist might've mirrored", wrote Tom Breihan for The A.V. Club in 2019. In a Christian Century article a year after the film's release, during which time Nixon had resigned, theologian Carl Raschke connected the two, calling them "psychodramas of the American soul" resulting from "the cynical mood of our age [arising] by default from the wreck of traditional religious as well as social values."

One other early 1970s challenge to a weakened social order has gotten considerable attention in discussions of The Exorcist: feminism. The U.S. women's liberation movement had enjoyed some early gains in legislatures and courts, and commentators have seen the film, in which a single working mother and her apparently uncontrollable daughter are ultimately rescued by patriarchal authority, as a reaction against feminism specifically. Peter Biskind, in Easy Riders and Raging Bulls, his history of the 1970s New Hollywood, describes the film as "a male nightmare of female puberty. Emergent female sexuality is equated with demonic possession." For the male authority figures in The Exorcist, whether priests or physicians, Regan must be restored to her innocence through abusive and violent means if necessary, the aspect of the film that he notes led John Boorman to decline the directing job.

For Breihan, this was because the film itself was reactionary: "The Exorcist seems like a transgressive work of art, but it's built on reverence of tradition. It has trust in institutions" he writes. "[It] almost sneers at the politics of the ’60s and at the way Hollywood embraced them." In the film's most overtly political scenes, those showing the shooting of the film Chris is making, she dismisses its take on student protest as "the Walt Disney version of the Ho Chi Minh story". In the only scene she is shown shooting, her character, a faculty member at the fictional college, grabs a megaphone and counsels a group of protesters against taking over the building and shutting down classes, telling them, "if you want change, you have to work within the system."

Like Biskind, many feminist critics have taken particular note of the film's focus on the female body as the site of horror in the film. "When her body changes, Regan becomes someone else; someone sexual, whose desire is a dark visitor, hollowing her out and corrupting her from within" writes Jude Ellison Doyle in Dead Blondes and Bad Mothers: Monstrosity, Patriarchy and the Fear of Female Power. "To become a woman is to become the worst thing on Earth, the enemy of all that is pure or holy."

Australian film studies professor Barbara Creed, in her seminal 1993 work The Monstrous-Feminine, which inaugurated psychoanalytic feminist film theory, counters the prevailing feminist take on The Exorcist by insisting that Pazuzu is female and thus the possession of Regan is itself a feminist act, exposing "the inability of the male order to control the woman whose perversity is expressed through her rebellious body", as she navigates an incestuous desire for her mother. Ilkka Mäyrä argues that this reading "to my mind, almost completely ignores the most important aspects of the particular conflicts that empower the demonic in this work", since it seems to be based largely on a female actress voicing the demon, ignores the novel entirely as well as indications of its maleness in the film, such as the clearly phallic Pazuzu figure shown both in Iraq and Regan's bedroom, along with images of ailing masculinity such as Merrin's frailty. "The demonic in The Exorcist can not be reduced to the conflict between sexes, even if the female body and sexuality (both male and female) play special roles in it."

University of Toronto professor S. Trimble writes that the film tapped into "white American fears of nightmare futures" that could be brought about by the women's liberation, gay liberation and Black Power movements, which all challenged the established social order of the 1970s. As a film about "a revolting girl revolting against the little-girl box in which she was stuck" and army of men trying to put her back, The Exorcist fits into a tradition of horror movies that used gender-bending to create a monster, Trimble notes.

As a graduate student, Texas State religious studies professor Joseph Laycock wrote that the popular embrace of The Exorcist also pointed to reactionary popular trends in American religion. "The Exorcist is a depiction not of ecclesiastical Catholicism but of folk piety", which he also describes as extra-ecclesiastical religion, pursued by the lay masses, "incorporat[ing] beliefs about divine or supernatural intervention in the realm of everyday experience", as tolerant of Ouija boards and practices from other spiritual traditions as it was devout in its Catholic faith. In the early 1970s, established organized religion in America, primarily but not exclusively the Roman Catholic Church, had increasingly turned towards the rational as the country became more secular: "The authentic folk piety depicted in The Exorcist likely appealed to audiences [at the time] because it was a welcome alternative to rationalized religion and a cultural myth of universal secularization."

Litigation

Lawsuits among the creators of The Exorcist began even before the film was released, and have continued into the 21st century. In early November 1973, ​THR reported that Blatty had sued the studio and Friedkin, over both the credits and Friedkin banning him from the set. Friedkin said that he had only barred him from post-production. A week later Noel Marshall, the film's executive producer, said Blatty had withdrawn his complaint against the studio but still planned to sue Friedkin; he eventually settled for the "William Peter Blatty's The Exorcist" line in the opening credits.

The next round of disputes involved Friedkin and Dietz. In February 1974 she claimed that he had forced her to sign a nondisclosure agreement concerning her work in the film. While Friedkin had, in earlier publicity for the film, denied any use of a double for Blair, by the end of the month Dietz was saying that she had neither claimed to have been Blair's only double for the possession scenes nor talked about it to the media. The Screen Actors Guild ruled her contract was not binding, but then Dietz declined to arbitrate the matter.

Around the same time, Warners paid Friedkin $4 million, his 10 percent share of the film's profits by that point. A year later, Friedkin sued the studio, claiming it had withheld another $8.5 million he was due under those terms. By 1978 it was reported that Friedkin had settled that suit, but by then Blatty was involved in litigation against Warners, claiming that the $15 million he had received from the studio as his share of the profit was still $1.5 million short.

In 2001, following the release of the extended version, which restored 11 minutes of footage and did well critically and commercially, Blatty and Friedkin sued Warners in federal court, alleging that they had been cheated out of profits they had been led to believe they would receive in return for helping promote the film. Specifically, they had been induced to do so by a promise of a share of the sale of the cable TV rights, which the studio gave to Turner Network Television and Turner Broadcasting System for free. Warners called the suit "ludicrous" Later that year, they filed an additional suit in state court, alleging that Warners had further defrauded them by selling broadcast rights to CBS at a discount, by claiming itself as the sole author of the new version of the film when registering it with the U.S. Copyright Office and by failing to honor an oral agreement with Friedkin to share the profits.

Nine years later, Blatty brought suit against Warners again, asking for the opportunity to inspect the studio's records and accounts, to see whether the studio had properly paid him what it owed. He argued that his deal with the studio made him a co-owner of the film property and thus he had unique rights to access those records. "[Warner Bros.] has asserted that Blatty must 'stand in line' with profit participants in [Warners'] other works who seek to audit [Warners]," his complaint read, "but who do not share Blatty's status as a co-owner."

Copyright infringement claims

Within a year of The Exorcists release, two films were quickly made that appeared to appropriate elements of its plot or production design. Warner took legal action against the producers of both, accusing them of copyright infringement. The lawsuits resulted in one film being pulled from distribution and the other one having to change its advertisements.

Abby, released almost a year after The Exorcist, put a blaxploitation spin on the material. In it a Yoruba demon released during an archeological dig in Africa crosses the Atlantic Ocean and possesses the archaeologist's daughter at home in Kentucky. Director William Girdler acknowledged the movie was intended to cash in on the success of The Exorcist. Warner's lawsuit early in 1975 resulted in most prints of the film being confiscated; the film has rarely been screened since and is not available on any home media.

Later, in 1975, Warners brought suit against Film Ventures International (FVI) over Beyond the Door, which had also been released near the end of 1974, alleging that its main character, also a possessed woman whose head spins around completely, projectile vomits and speaks with a deep voice when possessed, infringed the studio's copyright on Regan. Federal judge David W. Williams of the Central District of California held first that since Blatty had based the character on what he was told was a true story, Regan was not original to either film and thus Warner could not hold a copyright on Regan. Even if she had been a creation, she could not be copyrighted since she was subordinate to the story. The writers of the FVI film had also further distanced themselves from an infringement claim by having their possessed female, Jessica, be a pregnant adult woman.

Williams held for Warners on a minor issue. Some of Beyond the Doors advertising graphics, such as an image of light coming from behind a door into a darkened room, and the letter "T" drawn as a Christian cross, were similar enough to those used to promote The Exorcist that the public could reasonably have been confused into thinking the two films were the same, or made by the same people, and enjoined FVI from further use of those graphics.

Legacy

Effect on films and industry

"The Exorcist has done for the horror film what 2001 did for science fiction", wrote the Cinefantastique reviewer, "legitimizing it in the eyes of thousands who previously considered horror movies nothing more than a giggle". In the years following it, studios allotted large budgets to films like The Omen, The Sentinel, Burnt Offerings, Audrey Rose and The Amityville Horror, all of which had similar themes or plot elements and cast established stars, who until then had often avoided the genre until their later years. Friedkin's use of work like Polymorphia in the film's score also led to the use of similar modern avant-garde composers like Penderecki in later horror films like The Shining, and composers of original music for those films adopted some of their techniques, like dissonant intervals such as (particularly) tritones, sound massing and tone clusters, to create unease and tension.

The film's success led Warner to initiate a sequel, one of the first times a studio had done that with a major film that had not been planned to have one, launching a franchise. While many of the classic horror films of the 1930s, like Frankenstein and King Kong had spawned series of films, the practice had declined in the 60s, and although there had been exceptions like Bride of Frankenstein, most sequels had been secondary properties for the studios. The other big-budget horror films made in the wake of The Exorcist also led to sequels and franchises.

Amy Chambers observes that Friedkin also set a precedent not only by extensively consulting with technical experts in the subject matter, in The Exorcists case physicians and priests, but foregrounding that reliance on expertise by including those experts' names and credentials in the film's credits and press kit, a practice now common.

Cultural reference point

The Exorcist has become a cultural reference point in the years since its release. Its imagery, particularly Regan in her bedroom, has been used by political cartoonists like Mike Luckovich and Mike Peters. In 1998, New York Times columnist Maureen Dowd invoked the film when criticizing the nation's apparent indulgence of President Bill Clinton's sexual indiscretions: "[P]eople are saying things so bizarre they could have come out of Linda Blair in The Exorcist. ... You expect the feminists' heads to start rotating on their necks any moment now."

Father Merrin's arrival scene has also been referenced. In an early episode of the 1982-83 CBS sitcom Square Pegs, Don Novello as his Saturday Night Live (SNL) character Father Guido Sarducci enters a classroom, similarly backlit amidst fog, in order to exorcise a character from possession by the Pac-Man video game. In an episode set on Halloween 2019, a first-season episode of Evil, another CBS series, paid homage to the scene by a meticulous recreation in which the black-clad character stepping out of a cab into a beam of light from an upstairs window at the home of a possibly possessed woman is a psychiatrist, not a priest.

In 1992, the hard rock band Pantera named its sixth studio album Vulgar Display of Power, from the possessed Regan's demurral when Karras asks why, if the possessing spirit is indeed the Devil, she would continue asking him to remove the straps on her arms rather than making them disappear. The title was reused for a book about the band's adventures on tour culminating in the onstage shooting death of guitarist Dimebag Darrell.

Popular comedy used the film as an inspiration; SNL parodied the film during its first season, with Richard Pryor in the Karras role and Laraine Newman as Regan. Ghostbusters, the 1984 comedy blockbuster, included joking references to many successful horror movies from the previous two decades, including The Exorcist. In one scene, Sigourney Weaver's character has become possessed by an evil spirit, as Bill Murray's Dr. Peter Venkman attempts to communicate with her she begins to speak with a deep, husky voice and levitates above her bed. In 1990, Blair starred as a housewife needing exorcism in the parody Repossessed.

Court opinions in cases not concerning the film have referenced it. In 1999, Massachusetts federal judge Reginald C. Lindsay, considering a product-disparagement suit brought by Gillette against competitor Norelco, noted that in one of the latter's commercials for its Reflex Action shaver "the razor corrodes and twists its 'neck and head,' apparently in an effort to evoke recollection of a scene from the motion picture The Exorcist. At the same time, the voiceover states: 'A blade can leave you feeling irritated. What would possess it to do that?'" A Colorado lawyer challenging his 2005 suspension from the bar admitted his own recorded voice on obscene phone messages he left his wife while under the influence of cocaine sounded like the possessed Regan. Litigants have made similar observations about people experiencing mental illness.

Religious wariness toward the film abated as years passed and it became more widely accepted as a classic. "The Exorcist exposed people around the world to the question of evil in a new and terrifying way", wrote Jesuit Jim McDermott in a 2019 issue of America. "It is a film that takes on big questions and aspires to do much more than shock." In the heavily Baptist South, The Exorcist was seen as acceptable viewing amid denunciations of many other horror films that supposedly promoted the occult, because, as a writer in Slate recalls, it and movies like The Omen "didn't encourage people to dabble in the dark arts, they warned people. More to the point, they acknowledged the existence of God, the influence of Satan, and the truth of the Bible." British Baptist minister Peter Laws has credited the film with persuading him to abandon his youthful atheism and become a Christian:
 

In 2015, the District of Columbia posted a commemorative plaque on what had become known as the Exorcist steps in Georgetown, since they had become a popular tourist attraction. At a ceremony the day before Halloween that year, Blatty and Friedkin were among those present as the plaque, with Mayor Muriel Bowser's signature, was unveiled. Friedkin said that having his name on the plaque was a greater honor than another Academy Award would have been, since "the Academy may come and go. Its importance has been diminished over the years anyway. But that plaque on those steps is going to be there for a very long time."

Vietnamese-born Danish artist Danh Võ saw The Exorcist with his family after his Catholic mother became interested in horror films following the family's journey from Vietnam to Europe after the war. He was seven at the time. In 2016, he developed an exhibit inspired by the film that, other than the title, a string of 266 obscene phrases shouted by the possessed Regan to Karras, does not visually reference the film. The White Cube gallery in Hong Kong, which showed it, describes it as 600 carved mammoth fossils and a 17th-century ivory figurine suspended from the gallery's ceiling.

Accolades
The Exorcist was nominated for 10 Academy Awards in 1974, winning two. It was the first horror film to be nominated for Best Picture. The film was also nominated for seven Golden Globe Awards, winning four, including Best Motion Picture – Drama.

The revelations that other actresses had, contrary to Warners' and Friedkin's initial claims, augmented Blair's performance as Regan may have hurt her chances of winning, Kermode suspects. Blair was also dealing with widespread false rumors and press reports that the role had had adverse psychological effects. "They wrote all these articles about how deranged I was and the psychiatric problems I was supposed to have", she recalled in 1989.

Robert Knudson and Chris Newman won The Exorcists first Oscar, for Best Sound, thanking Friedkin, the studio and their crews. Blatty won for Best Adapted Screenplay; the award was presented by Angie Dickinson and Miller, who applauded vigorously as Blatty came out to accept it. In his short speech, Blatty posthumously thanked William Bloom, "who taught me the rudiments and the craft of screenwriting" and Friedkin. He also paid tribute to both his parents, "who came to this country on a cattle boat and whose love and whose courage have brought me to this moment and to this place."

The morning after the ceremony, Blatty complained bitterly about the minimal awards the film had received. In commentary published on the front page of The Hollywood Reporter (THR), he said it was a "disgrace" that The Exorcist had not won more awards, that it should have won all it was nominated for. It was, he asserted, "head and shoulders, the finest film made this year and in many other years".

"Since I won an award, perhaps it would be considered ungracious," he admitted to THR. "But I'd rather be ungracious than be a hypocrite." He accused veteran director George Cukor of having led a campaign against giving the film any awards, accounting for its meager haul.

American Film Institute Lists
 AFI's 100 Years...100 Thrills – No. 3
 AFI's 100 Years...100 Heroes and Villains:
 Regan MacNeil – No. 9 Villain

Sequels and prequels

The film has gone on to spawn multiple sequels and an overarching media franchise including a television series.

Exorcist II: The Heretic

A year after The Exorcists release, New York reported that a sequel was planned. But Blatty, still in court with the studio over money owed in addition to the $20 million he had reportedly already received, would not be involved. Friedkin, similarly dissatisfied with his share of the profits, agreed only to produce. Ultimately he, too, had nothing to do with the sequel, nor did any of the original cast who had played major characters beyond Blair and von Sydow. John Boorman, who had turned down the original as "negative and destructive", directed, considering the sequel to be "healthy" in comparison, and Richard Burton played the lead; the film also suffered production problems, particular cast and crew health issues, and was beset by regular script rewrites and personnel changes. On release in 1977, Exorcist II: The Heretic had what was at the time Warners' largest opening-day gross and ultimately made some money, but revenues dropped 60 percent in the film's second week and ultimately grosses were minimal. Friedkin recalled on a 2019 podcast hosted by Dante and Josh Olson that after seeing 40 minutes of the film following a chance encounter with one of the technicians working on it at a color lab, Exorcist II was "the worst piece of shit I've ever seen ... a fucking disgrace".

The Exorcist III

In the wake of Exorcist IIs failure, Blatty and Friedkin began talking about a sequel of their own. They began planning a story and script. Blatty continued after Friedkin dropped out and, finding little interest in making a third Exorcist film, decided, instead, to tell the story as a new novel: Legion, in 1983. He saw the story, in which Kinderman investigates a string of murders that seem to have been committed by a possessed, resurrected Father Karras, not as a sequel to The Exorcist but an exploration of the same themes within the same fictional universe by some of the original's minor characters. The media saw it differently, and it sold well.

Blatty adapted a more streamlined script from the novel, and eventually chose Morgan Creek Productions over Carolco since that studio had wanted him to write an entirely new script in which an adult Regan gives birth to possessed twins while Morgan Creek was satisfied with his story. But Morgan Creek insisted on calling it The Exorcist III even though the story lacked any exorcism scenes (one was added after principal photography, with Nicol Williamson cast in the role). Blatty directed, with George C. Scott taking over for the deceased Lee J. Cobb as Kinderman, Ed Flanders replacing O'Malley as Dyer and Miller returning as Karras or his double. Brad Dourif played the film's serial killer, and Scott Wilson the chief psychiatrist at the hospital where the film is mostly set. The film took in $39 million on its release in 1990; In 2014 a VHS copy of Blatty's cut was found, restored and released on a two-disc collector's edition Blu-ray two years later.

Exorcist: The Beginning and Dominion

At that time, Morgan Creek and James G. Robinson, producer of Exorcist III, had commissioned the development of a prequel story, one telling the story of a young Father Merrin's first confrontation with Pazuzu. Again, making the film presented many problems once it was greenlighted seven years later. Novelist Caleb Carr was hired to rewrite William Wisher Jr.'s original script, with John Frankenheimer set to direct and Liam Neeson to star as Merrin, but when cameras began rolling in late 2002 Paul Schrader was in the director's chair making his first horror film in two decades, now a Stellan Skarsgård vehicle, as Frankenheimer had died and Neeson was no longer interested. Four more writers had been involved and the budget doubled to $38 million by the time shooting ended in early 2003.

Robinson was unimpressed with the film, believing it lacked the horror elements that had characterized the earlier films in the franchise. He and Schrader feuded for the rest of the year over how to edit it, until Robinson finally decided to hire Renny Harlin to reshoot most of the film with Skarsgård and a new cast. Shortly after shooting began in Rome, Harlin was hit by a car, breaking his leg severely enough to require surgery and stopping production for two weeks; he finished the remaining six weeks on crutches. The cost of making both films combined to over $100 million.

Harlin's version, heavy on action and horror, was released in August 2004 as Exorcist: The Beginning, and failed with critics and at the box office. Blatty called watching it "the most humiliating professional experience of my life", blaming not Harlin but Morgan Creek. He had watched it with Schrader, who said its poor quality made it likely that the studio would try to save face by releasing his version, and returned to do the editing. It got a limited release in May 2005 as Dominion: Prequel to the Exorcist, a version Blatty found much more enjoyable.

TV series

The 2016 Fox TV series The Exorcist followed two priests investigating possible cases of demonic possession and performing exorcisms. Five episodes into the first of its two seasons, the mother of a young woman convinced her daughter was possessed needed an exorcism was revealed to be an adult Regan, making the series a direct sequel to the original film that did not acknowledge either of the filmed sequels. It was cancelled due to being the network's lowest-rated show during its second season.

2020s reboot trilogy

In 2020, Morgan Creek announced a reboot of the film. Fans were hostile to the idea and petitioned to have it canceled. At the end of the year, Blumhouse Productions and Morgan Creek said that the reboot would instead be a "direct sequel" to the 1973 film directed by David Gordon Green. In July 2021, it was announced that Green would be directing a trilogy. Jason Blum will produce, alongside James and David Robinson. Burstyn will reprise her role from the original film, with Leslie Odom Jr. co-starring. The projects will be joint ventures between Blumhouse and Morgan Creek, to be distributed by Universal, which joined with Peacock to purchase distribution rights for $400 million.

Related works
Blatty's script for the film has been published in two versions. William Peter Blatty on The Exorcist: From Novel to Film, in 1974, included the first draft of the screenplay. In 1998 the script was anthologized in The Exorcist/Legion - Two Classic Screenplays, and again as a standalone text in 2000.

See also

 1973 in film
 1973 in the United States
 List of American films of 1973
 List of film and television accidents
 List of highest-grossing films in the United States and Canada
 List of horror films of 1973
 List of films considered the best

Notes

References

Works cited

Further reading

External links

 
 
 
 
 
 The Exorcist at filmsite.org

 The Exorcist at the TCM Movie Database (archived)

The Exorcist films
Films about teenagers
1970s psychological thriller films
1970s supernatural horror films
1973 films
1973 drama films
1973 horror films
1970s horror drama films
1970s American films
American films based on actual events
American psychological horror films
American psychological thriller films
American supernatural horror films
Best Drama Picture Golden Globe winners
Censored films
Demons in film
1970s English-language films
1970s Arabic-language films
Films about actors
Films about Catholic priests
Films about Christianity
Films about film directors and producers
Films about exorcism
Films about telekinesis
Films based on American horror novels
Films directed by William Friedkin
Films featuring a Best Supporting Actress Golden Globe-winning performance
Films scored by Jack Nitzsche
Films set in Iraq
Films set in Washington, D.C.
Films shot in Iraq
Films shot in New York City
Films shot in Washington, D.C.
Films that won the Best Sound Mixing Academy Award
Films whose director won the Best Director Golden Globe
Films whose writer won the Best Adapted Screenplay Academy Award
American horror drama films
Films about mother–daughter relationships
Film controversies in the United States
Film controversies in the United Kingdom
Obscenity controversies in film
Rating controversies in film
Religious horror films
Supernatural drama films
United States National Film Registry films
Warner Bros. films